

120001–120100 

|-bgcolor=#fefefe
| 120001 ||  || — || December 31, 2002 || Socorro || LINEAR || FLO || align=right | 1.4 km || 
|-id=002 bgcolor=#fefefe
| 120002 ||  || — || December 31, 2002 || Socorro || LINEAR || — || align=right | 1.6 km || 
|-id=003 bgcolor=#fefefe
| 120003 ||  || — || December 31, 2002 || Socorro || LINEAR || NYS || align=right | 1.4 km || 
|-id=004 bgcolor=#fefefe
| 120004 ||  || — || December 31, 2002 || Socorro || LINEAR || — || align=right | 1.4 km || 
|-id=005 bgcolor=#fefefe
| 120005 ||  || — || December 31, 2002 || Socorro || LINEAR || NYS || align=right | 1.5 km || 
|-id=006 bgcolor=#fefefe
| 120006 ||  || — || December 31, 2002 || Socorro || LINEAR || — || align=right | 1.4 km || 
|-id=007 bgcolor=#fefefe
| 120007 ||  || — || December 31, 2002 || Socorro || LINEAR || — || align=right | 1.8 km || 
|-id=008 bgcolor=#fefefe
| 120008 ||  || — || January 1, 2003 || Socorro || LINEAR || V || align=right | 1.3 km || 
|-id=009 bgcolor=#E9E9E9
| 120009 ||  || — || January 1, 2003 || Socorro || LINEAR || HNS || align=right | 2.6 km || 
|-id=010 bgcolor=#fefefe
| 120010 ||  || — || January 1, 2003 || Socorro || LINEAR || NYS || align=right | 1.9 km || 
|-id=011 bgcolor=#fefefe
| 120011 ||  || — || January 1, 2003 || Socorro || LINEAR || — || align=right | 1.8 km || 
|-id=012 bgcolor=#fefefe
| 120012 ||  || — || January 2, 2003 || Socorro || LINEAR || — || align=right | 2.0 km || 
|-id=013 bgcolor=#fefefe
| 120013 ||  || — || January 5, 2003 || Anderson Mesa || LONEOS || — || align=right | 1.9 km || 
|-id=014 bgcolor=#fefefe
| 120014 ||  || — || January 5, 2003 || Socorro || LINEAR || FLO || align=right | 1.3 km || 
|-id=015 bgcolor=#fefefe
| 120015 ||  || — || January 4, 2003 || Socorro || LINEAR || — || align=right | 1.1 km || 
|-id=016 bgcolor=#fefefe
| 120016 ||  || — || January 4, 2003 || Socorro || LINEAR || — || align=right | 3.6 km || 
|-id=017 bgcolor=#fefefe
| 120017 ||  || — || January 7, 2003 || Socorro || LINEAR || V || align=right | 1.2 km || 
|-id=018 bgcolor=#fefefe
| 120018 ||  || — || January 7, 2003 || Socorro || LINEAR || — || align=right | 1.8 km || 
|-id=019 bgcolor=#fefefe
| 120019 ||  || — || January 7, 2003 || Socorro || LINEAR || V || align=right | 1.4 km || 
|-id=020 bgcolor=#fefefe
| 120020 ||  || — || January 7, 2003 || Socorro || LINEAR || — || align=right | 3.0 km || 
|-id=021 bgcolor=#fefefe
| 120021 ||  || — || January 7, 2003 || Socorro || LINEAR || FLO || align=right | 1.1 km || 
|-id=022 bgcolor=#fefefe
| 120022 ||  || — || January 7, 2003 || Socorro || LINEAR || — || align=right | 1.6 km || 
|-id=023 bgcolor=#fefefe
| 120023 ||  || — || January 5, 2003 || Socorro || LINEAR || — || align=right | 1.8 km || 
|-id=024 bgcolor=#fefefe
| 120024 ||  || — || January 5, 2003 || Socorro || LINEAR || — || align=right | 1.8 km || 
|-id=025 bgcolor=#fefefe
| 120025 ||  || — || January 5, 2003 || Socorro || LINEAR || FLO || align=right | 1.4 km || 
|-id=026 bgcolor=#fefefe
| 120026 ||  || — || January 5, 2003 || Socorro || LINEAR || — || align=right | 1.4 km || 
|-id=027 bgcolor=#fefefe
| 120027 ||  || — || January 5, 2003 || Socorro || LINEAR || NYS || align=right | 3.6 km || 
|-id=028 bgcolor=#fefefe
| 120028 ||  || — || January 5, 2003 || Socorro || LINEAR || — || align=right | 1.6 km || 
|-id=029 bgcolor=#fefefe
| 120029 ||  || — || January 5, 2003 || Socorro || LINEAR || — || align=right | 4.9 km || 
|-id=030 bgcolor=#fefefe
| 120030 ||  || — || January 7, 2003 || Socorro || LINEAR || — || align=right | 1.4 km || 
|-id=031 bgcolor=#E9E9E9
| 120031 ||  || — || January 9, 2003 || Socorro || LINEAR || MAR || align=right | 2.2 km || 
|-id=032 bgcolor=#E9E9E9
| 120032 ||  || — || January 8, 2003 || Socorro || LINEAR || PAD || align=right | 3.2 km || 
|-id=033 bgcolor=#d6d6d6
| 120033 ||  || — || January 10, 2003 || Kitt Peak || Spacewatch || — || align=right | 2.6 km || 
|-id=034 bgcolor=#E9E9E9
| 120034 ||  || — || January 10, 2003 || Kitt Peak || Spacewatch || — || align=right | 1.8 km || 
|-id=035 bgcolor=#fefefe
| 120035 ||  || — || January 10, 2003 || Socorro || LINEAR || V || align=right | 1.2 km || 
|-id=036 bgcolor=#fefefe
| 120036 ||  || — || January 4, 2003 || Socorro || LINEAR || PHO || align=right | 3.2 km || 
|-id=037 bgcolor=#fefefe
| 120037 ||  || — || January 5, 2003 || Socorro || LINEAR || — || align=right | 1.6 km || 
|-id=038 bgcolor=#fefefe
| 120038 Franlainsher ||  ||  || January 26, 2003 || Wrightwood || J. W. Young || — || align=right | 1.3 km || 
|-id=039 bgcolor=#fefefe
| 120039 ||  || — || January 25, 2003 || Anderson Mesa || LONEOS || V || align=right | 1.4 km || 
|-id=040 bgcolor=#E9E9E9
| 120040 Pagliarini ||  ||  || January 24, 2003 || La Silla || A. Boattini, H. Scholl || — || align=right | 1.6 km || 
|-id=041 bgcolor=#E9E9E9
| 120041 ||  || — || January 24, 2003 || Palomar || NEAT || — || align=right | 1.6 km || 
|-id=042 bgcolor=#fefefe
| 120042 ||  || — || January 26, 2003 || Palomar || NEAT || fast || align=right | 1.4 km || 
|-id=043 bgcolor=#d6d6d6
| 120043 ||  || — || January 26, 2003 || Anderson Mesa || LONEOS || TRE || align=right | 5.4 km || 
|-id=044 bgcolor=#fefefe
| 120044 ||  || — || January 27, 2003 || Haleakala || NEAT || — || align=right | 1.5 km || 
|-id=045 bgcolor=#E9E9E9
| 120045 ||  || — || January 25, 2003 || Palomar || NEAT || MAR || align=right | 2.2 km || 
|-id=046 bgcolor=#E9E9E9
| 120046 ||  || — || January 26, 2003 || Anderson Mesa || LONEOS || — || align=right | 4.5 km || 
|-id=047 bgcolor=#fefefe
| 120047 ||  || — || January 26, 2003 || Anderson Mesa || LONEOS || FLO || align=right | 1.2 km || 
|-id=048 bgcolor=#fefefe
| 120048 ||  || — || January 27, 2003 || Anderson Mesa || LONEOS || — || align=right | 2.5 km || 
|-id=049 bgcolor=#d6d6d6
| 120049 ||  || — || January 27, 2003 || Socorro || LINEAR || — || align=right | 3.7 km || 
|-id=050 bgcolor=#fefefe
| 120050 ||  || — || January 27, 2003 || Kitt Peak || Spacewatch || NYS || align=right | 1.4 km || 
|-id=051 bgcolor=#E9E9E9
| 120051 ||  || — || January 30, 2003 || Anderson Mesa || LONEOS || — || align=right | 2.3 km || 
|-id=052 bgcolor=#fefefe
| 120052 ||  || — || January 30, 2003 || Haleakala || NEAT || — || align=right | 1.6 km || 
|-id=053 bgcolor=#fefefe
| 120053 ||  || — || January 30, 2003 || Anderson Mesa || LONEOS || NYS || align=right | 1.3 km || 
|-id=054 bgcolor=#fefefe
| 120054 ||  || — || January 28, 2003 || Socorro || LINEAR || — || align=right | 1.6 km || 
|-id=055 bgcolor=#E9E9E9
| 120055 ||  || — || January 29, 2003 || Palomar || NEAT || — || align=right | 4.7 km || 
|-id=056 bgcolor=#E9E9E9
| 120056 ||  || — || January 31, 2003 || Anderson Mesa || LONEOS || — || align=right | 4.5 km || 
|-id=057 bgcolor=#fefefe
| 120057 ||  || — || January 31, 2003 || Socorro || LINEAR || — || align=right | 1.4 km || 
|-id=058 bgcolor=#E9E9E9
| 120058 ||  || — || January 31, 2003 || Socorro || LINEAR || — || align=right | 1.8 km || 
|-id=059 bgcolor=#fefefe
| 120059 ||  || — || January 31, 2003 || Anderson Mesa || LONEOS || — || align=right | 1.6 km || 
|-id=060 bgcolor=#fefefe
| 120060 ||  || — || January 30, 2003 || Haleakala || NEAT || FLO || align=right | 1.2 km || 
|-id=061 bgcolor=#C7FF8F
| 120061 ||  || — || February 1, 2003 || Palomar || NEAT || centaur || align=right | 82 km || 
|-id=062 bgcolor=#fefefe
| 120062 ||  || — || February 1, 2003 || Socorro || LINEAR || — || align=right | 1.7 km || 
|-id=063 bgcolor=#fefefe
| 120063 ||  || — || February 1, 2003 || Socorro || LINEAR || — || align=right | 1.6 km || 
|-id=064 bgcolor=#fefefe
| 120064 ||  || — || February 1, 2003 || Socorro || LINEAR || — || align=right | 1.5 km || 
|-id=065 bgcolor=#E9E9E9
| 120065 ||  || — || February 1, 2003 || Socorro || LINEAR || — || align=right | 4.1 km || 
|-id=066 bgcolor=#fefefe
| 120066 ||  || — || February 7, 2003 || Palomar || NEAT || NYS || align=right | 1.3 km || 
|-id=067 bgcolor=#E9E9E9
| 120067 ||  || — || February 6, 2003 || Kitt Peak || Spacewatch || — || align=right | 3.5 km || 
|-id=068 bgcolor=#E9E9E9
| 120068 ||  || — || February 21, 2003 || Palomar || NEAT || — || align=right | 2.3 km || 
|-id=069 bgcolor=#fefefe
| 120069 ||  || — || February 22, 2003 || Palomar || NEAT || — || align=right | 1.6 km || 
|-id=070 bgcolor=#E9E9E9
| 120070 ||  || — || February 22, 2003 || Palomar || NEAT || — || align=right | 3.5 km || 
|-id=071 bgcolor=#d6d6d6
| 120071 ||  || — || February 21, 2003 || Palomar || NEAT || EOS || align=right | 3.1 km || 
|-id=072 bgcolor=#fefefe
| 120072 ||  || — || February 19, 2003 || Palomar || NEAT || V || align=right | 1.1 km || 
|-id=073 bgcolor=#E9E9E9
| 120073 ||  || — || February 22, 2003 || Palomar || NEAT || NEM || align=right | 4.2 km || 
|-id=074 bgcolor=#E9E9E9
| 120074 Bass || 2003 EA ||  || March 1, 2003 || Jornada || D. S. Dixon || — || align=right | 2.9 km || 
|-id=075 bgcolor=#E9E9E9
| 120075 ||  || — || March 5, 2003 || Socorro || LINEAR || — || align=right | 4.4 km || 
|-id=076 bgcolor=#E9E9E9
| 120076 ||  || — || March 5, 2003 || Socorro || LINEAR || — || align=right | 1.8 km || 
|-id=077 bgcolor=#E9E9E9
| 120077 ||  || — || March 6, 2003 || Palomar || NEAT || NEM || align=right | 4.3 km || 
|-id=078 bgcolor=#fefefe
| 120078 ||  || — || March 6, 2003 || Desert Eagle || W. K. Y. Yeung || — || align=right | 1.9 km || 
|-id=079 bgcolor=#E9E9E9
| 120079 ||  || — || March 6, 2003 || Anderson Mesa || LONEOS || — || align=right | 3.7 km || 
|-id=080 bgcolor=#E9E9E9
| 120080 ||  || — || March 6, 2003 || Socorro || LINEAR || — || align=right | 3.4 km || 
|-id=081 bgcolor=#d6d6d6
| 120081 ||  || — || March 6, 2003 || Socorro || LINEAR || — || align=right | 3.7 km || 
|-id=082 bgcolor=#E9E9E9
| 120082 ||  || — || March 6, 2003 || Socorro || LINEAR || — || align=right | 1.9 km || 
|-id=083 bgcolor=#E9E9E9
| 120083 ||  || — || March 5, 2003 || Socorro || LINEAR || — || align=right | 2.8 km || 
|-id=084 bgcolor=#E9E9E9
| 120084 ||  || — || March 6, 2003 || Anderson Mesa || LONEOS || — || align=right | 3.8 km || 
|-id=085 bgcolor=#E9E9E9
| 120085 ||  || — || March 6, 2003 || Socorro || LINEAR || HNA || align=right | 4.6 km || 
|-id=086 bgcolor=#E9E9E9
| 120086 ||  || — || March 6, 2003 || Socorro || LINEAR || — || align=right | 2.7 km || 
|-id=087 bgcolor=#d6d6d6
| 120087 ||  || — || March 6, 2003 || Anderson Mesa || LONEOS || — || align=right | 4.4 km || 
|-id=088 bgcolor=#E9E9E9
| 120088 ||  || — || March 7, 2003 || Anderson Mesa || LONEOS || — || align=right | 5.4 km || 
|-id=089 bgcolor=#d6d6d6
| 120089 ||  || — || March 7, 2003 || Kitt Peak || Spacewatch || — || align=right | 4.4 km || 
|-id=090 bgcolor=#E9E9E9
| 120090 ||  || — || March 7, 2003 || Socorro || LINEAR || — || align=right | 2.9 km || 
|-id=091 bgcolor=#d6d6d6
| 120091 ||  || — || March 7, 2003 || Socorro || LINEAR || — || align=right | 5.6 km || 
|-id=092 bgcolor=#d6d6d6
| 120092 ||  || — || March 7, 2003 || Anderson Mesa || LONEOS || — || align=right | 4.6 km || 
|-id=093 bgcolor=#E9E9E9
| 120093 ||  || — || March 8, 2003 || Anderson Mesa || LONEOS || EUN || align=right | 2.4 km || 
|-id=094 bgcolor=#E9E9E9
| 120094 ||  || — || March 8, 2003 || Socorro || LINEAR || — || align=right | 3.2 km || 
|-id=095 bgcolor=#fefefe
| 120095 ||  || — || March 9, 2003 || Socorro || LINEAR || — || align=right | 1.7 km || 
|-id=096 bgcolor=#E9E9E9
| 120096 ||  || — || March 9, 2003 || Anderson Mesa || LONEOS || MAR || align=right | 2.9 km || 
|-id=097 bgcolor=#E9E9E9
| 120097 ||  || — || March 10, 2003 || Campo Imperatore || CINEOS || — || align=right | 4.6 km || 
|-id=098 bgcolor=#d6d6d6
| 120098 ||  || — || March 10, 2003 || Campo Imperatore || CINEOS || EOS || align=right | 3.5 km || 
|-id=099 bgcolor=#d6d6d6
| 120099 ||  || — || March 9, 2003 || Socorro || LINEAR || — || align=right | 6.4 km || 
|-id=100 bgcolor=#d6d6d6
| 120100 ||  || — || March 9, 2003 || Socorro || LINEAR || — || align=right | 7.3 km || 
|}

120101–120200 

|-bgcolor=#d6d6d6
| 120101 ||  || — || March 26, 2003 || Campo Imperatore || CINEOS || — || align=right | 3.8 km || 
|-id=102 bgcolor=#E9E9E9
| 120102 ||  || — || March 26, 2003 || Campo Imperatore || CINEOS || — || align=right | 3.3 km || 
|-id=103 bgcolor=#E9E9E9
| 120103 Dolero ||  ||  || March 24, 2003 || Saint-Sulpice || B. Christophe || POS || align=right | 5.0 km || 
|-id=104 bgcolor=#E9E9E9
| 120104 ||  || — || March 21, 2003 || Palomar || NEAT || MAR || align=right | 2.7 km || 
|-id=105 bgcolor=#E9E9E9
| 120105 ||  || — || March 23, 2003 || Kitt Peak || Spacewatch || AST || align=right | 2.7 km || 
|-id=106 bgcolor=#E9E9E9
| 120106 ||  || — || March 23, 2003 || Catalina || CSS || — || align=right | 4.3 km || 
|-id=107 bgcolor=#fefefe
| 120107 ||  || — || March 24, 2003 || Kitt Peak || Spacewatch || NYS || align=right | 1.4 km || 
|-id=108 bgcolor=#d6d6d6
| 120108 ||  || — || March 24, 2003 || Kitt Peak || Spacewatch || — || align=right | 4.3 km || 
|-id=109 bgcolor=#E9E9E9
| 120109 ||  || — || March 25, 2003 || Palomar || NEAT || — || align=right | 3.1 km || 
|-id=110 bgcolor=#E9E9E9
| 120110 ||  || — || March 25, 2003 || Palomar || NEAT || GEF || align=right | 2.4 km || 
|-id=111 bgcolor=#d6d6d6
| 120111 ||  || — || March 23, 2003 || Kitt Peak || Spacewatch || — || align=right | 6.0 km || 
|-id=112 bgcolor=#E9E9E9
| 120112 Elizabethacton ||  ||  || March 25, 2003 || Catalina || CSS || — || align=right | 2.6 km || 
|-id=113 bgcolor=#E9E9E9
| 120113 ||  || — || March 26, 2003 || Socorro || LINEAR || — || align=right | 3.7 km || 
|-id=114 bgcolor=#fefefe
| 120114 ||  || — || March 26, 2003 || Palomar || NEAT || — || align=right | 1.4 km || 
|-id=115 bgcolor=#d6d6d6
| 120115 ||  || — || March 26, 2003 || Palomar || NEAT || EOS || align=right | 3.3 km || 
|-id=116 bgcolor=#E9E9E9
| 120116 ||  || — || March 27, 2003 || Palomar || NEAT || — || align=right | 2.9 km || 
|-id=117 bgcolor=#E9E9E9
| 120117 ||  || — || March 27, 2003 || Socorro || LINEAR || EUN || align=right | 1.8 km || 
|-id=118 bgcolor=#E9E9E9
| 120118 ||  || — || March 27, 2003 || Palomar || NEAT || HNS || align=right | 2.8 km || 
|-id=119 bgcolor=#E9E9E9
| 120119 ||  || — || March 28, 2003 || Palomar || NEAT || — || align=right | 3.1 km || 
|-id=120 bgcolor=#d6d6d6
| 120120 Kankelborg ||  ||  || March 28, 2003 || Needville || J. Dellinger || KOR || align=right | 2.3 km || 
|-id=121 bgcolor=#d6d6d6
| 120121 Libbyadelman ||  ||  || March 28, 2003 || Catalina || CSS || — || align=right | 6.2 km || 
|-id=122 bgcolor=#E9E9E9
| 120122 ||  || — || March 28, 2003 || Kitt Peak || Spacewatch || — || align=right | 2.4 km || 
|-id=123 bgcolor=#E9E9E9
| 120123 ||  || — || March 29, 2003 || Anderson Mesa || LONEOS || EUN || align=right | 1.9 km || 
|-id=124 bgcolor=#E9E9E9
| 120124 ||  || — || March 30, 2003 || Kitt Peak || Spacewatch || — || align=right | 3.0 km || 
|-id=125 bgcolor=#d6d6d6
| 120125 ||  || — || March 31, 2003 || Anderson Mesa || LONEOS || EMA || align=right | 8.1 km || 
|-id=126 bgcolor=#d6d6d6
| 120126 ||  || — || March 31, 2003 || Socorro || LINEAR || — || align=right | 4.6 km || 
|-id=127 bgcolor=#E9E9E9
| 120127 ||  || — || March 31, 2003 || Socorro || LINEAR || — || align=right | 3.1 km || 
|-id=128 bgcolor=#d6d6d6
| 120128 ||  || — || March 26, 2003 || Kitt Peak || Spacewatch || — || align=right | 7.1 km || 
|-id=129 bgcolor=#E9E9E9
| 120129 ||  || — || March 25, 2003 || Palomar || NEAT || — || align=right | 1.8 km || 
|-id=130 bgcolor=#E9E9E9
| 120130 ||  || — || March 26, 2003 || Anderson Mesa || LONEOS || RAF || align=right | 1.5 km || 
|-id=131 bgcolor=#d6d6d6
| 120131 ||  || — || March 26, 2003 || Anderson Mesa || LONEOS || — || align=right | 3.3 km || 
|-id=132 bgcolor=#C2E0FF
| 120132 ||  || — || March 26, 2003 || Palomar || NEAT || SDO || align=right | 488 km || 
|-id=133 bgcolor=#E9E9E9
| 120133 ||  || — || April 1, 2003 || Socorro || LINEAR || MRX || align=right | 2.3 km || 
|-id=134 bgcolor=#fefefe
| 120134 ||  || — || April 2, 2003 || Socorro || LINEAR || — || align=right | 1.9 km || 
|-id=135 bgcolor=#fefefe
| 120135 ||  || — || April 1, 2003 || Socorro || LINEAR || — || align=right | 1.5 km || 
|-id=136 bgcolor=#d6d6d6
| 120136 ||  || — || April 1, 2003 || Socorro || LINEAR || — || align=right | 4.4 km || 
|-id=137 bgcolor=#E9E9E9
| 120137 ||  || — || April 3, 2003 || Haleakala || NEAT || — || align=right | 3.6 km || 
|-id=138 bgcolor=#d6d6d6
| 120138 ||  || — || April 5, 2003 || Haleakala || NEAT || — || align=right | 6.5 km || 
|-id=139 bgcolor=#E9E9E9
| 120139 ||  || — || April 3, 2003 || Reedy Creek || J. Broughton || — || align=right | 5.2 km || 
|-id=140 bgcolor=#d6d6d6
| 120140 ||  || — || April 3, 2003 || Uccle || Uccle Obs. || — || align=right | 4.6 km || 
|-id=141 bgcolor=#E9E9E9
| 120141 Lucaslara ||  ||  || April 7, 2003 || Majorca || OAM Obs. || MRX || align=right | 1.7 km || 
|-id=142 bgcolor=#E9E9E9
| 120142 ||  || — || April 5, 2003 || Haleakala || NEAT || — || align=right | 5.3 km || 
|-id=143 bgcolor=#d6d6d6
| 120143 ||  || — || April 9, 2003 || Reedy Creek || J. Broughton || — || align=right | 7.0 km || 
|-id=144 bgcolor=#d6d6d6
| 120144 ||  || — || April 9, 2003 || Socorro || LINEAR || 615 || align=right | 3.2 km || 
|-id=145 bgcolor=#d6d6d6
| 120145 ||  || — || April 8, 2003 || Socorro || LINEAR || — || align=right | 7.4 km || 
|-id=146 bgcolor=#E9E9E9
| 120146 ||  || — || April 7, 2003 || Socorro || LINEAR || — || align=right | 4.8 km || 
|-id=147 bgcolor=#fefefe
| 120147 ||  || — || April 7, 2003 || Socorro || LINEAR || — || align=right | 1.8 km || 
|-id=148 bgcolor=#E9E9E9
| 120148 ||  || — || April 12, 2003 || Emerald Lane || L. Ball || — || align=right | 2.0 km || 
|-id=149 bgcolor=#E9E9E9
| 120149 ||  || — || April 6, 2003 || Socorro || LINEAR || — || align=right | 2.3 km || 
|-id=150 bgcolor=#d6d6d6
| 120150 ||  || — || April 3, 2003 || Anderson Mesa || LONEOS || KOR || align=right | 2.6 km || 
|-id=151 bgcolor=#d6d6d6
| 120151 ||  || — || April 3, 2003 || Anderson Mesa || LONEOS || — || align=right | 5.5 km || 
|-id=152 bgcolor=#d6d6d6
| 120152 ||  || — || April 21, 2003 || Siding Spring || R. H. McNaught || — || align=right | 5.9 km || 
|-id=153 bgcolor=#d6d6d6
| 120153 Hoekenga ||  ||  || April 21, 2003 || Catalina || CSS || — || align=right | 3.6 km || 
|-id=154 bgcolor=#d6d6d6
| 120154 ||  || — || April 24, 2003 || Anderson Mesa || LONEOS || EOS || align=right | 4.8 km || 
|-id=155 bgcolor=#d6d6d6
| 120155 ||  || — || April 24, 2003 || Anderson Mesa || LONEOS || — || align=right | 5.7 km || 
|-id=156 bgcolor=#E9E9E9
| 120156 ||  || — || April 25, 2003 || Kitt Peak || Spacewatch || — || align=right | 3.6 km || 
|-id=157 bgcolor=#E9E9E9
| 120157 ||  || — || April 25, 2003 || Kitt Peak || Spacewatch || — || align=right | 2.2 km || 
|-id=158 bgcolor=#d6d6d6
| 120158 ||  || — || April 26, 2003 || Haleakala || NEAT || EOS || align=right | 3.9 km || 
|-id=159 bgcolor=#d6d6d6
| 120159 ||  || — || April 26, 2003 || Haleakala || NEAT || — || align=right | 6.9 km || 
|-id=160 bgcolor=#E9E9E9
| 120160 ||  || — || April 28, 2003 || Anderson Mesa || LONEOS || — || align=right | 3.8 km || 
|-id=161 bgcolor=#d6d6d6
| 120161 ||  || — || April 26, 2003 || Kitt Peak || Spacewatch || VER || align=right | 6.0 km || 
|-id=162 bgcolor=#d6d6d6
| 120162 ||  || — || April 29, 2003 || Kitt Peak || Spacewatch || KOR || align=right | 2.3 km || 
|-id=163 bgcolor=#d6d6d6
| 120163 ||  || — || April 27, 2003 || Anderson Mesa || LONEOS || — || align=right | 6.1 km || 
|-id=164 bgcolor=#d6d6d6
| 120164 ||  || — || April 27, 2003 || Socorro || LINEAR || — || align=right | 7.8 km || 
|-id=165 bgcolor=#d6d6d6
| 120165 ||  || — || April 28, 2003 || Socorro || LINEAR || TIR || align=right | 3.5 km || 
|-id=166 bgcolor=#d6d6d6
| 120166 ||  || — || April 28, 2003 || Socorro || LINEAR || — || align=right | 8.3 km || 
|-id=167 bgcolor=#d6d6d6
| 120167 ||  || — || April 29, 2003 || Haleakala || NEAT || URS || align=right | 5.4 km || 
|-id=168 bgcolor=#E9E9E9
| 120168 ||  || — || April 29, 2003 || Socorro || LINEAR || — || align=right | 2.8 km || 
|-id=169 bgcolor=#d6d6d6
| 120169 ||  || — || April 30, 2003 || Socorro || LINEAR || — || align=right | 3.6 km || 
|-id=170 bgcolor=#d6d6d6
| 120170 ||  || — || May 1, 2003 || Socorro || LINEAR || EOS || align=right | 3.2 km || 
|-id=171 bgcolor=#E9E9E9
| 120171 ||  || — || May 1, 2003 || Socorro || LINEAR || — || align=right | 4.5 km || 
|-id=172 bgcolor=#d6d6d6
| 120172 ||  || — || May 3, 2003 || Kitt Peak || Spacewatch || — || align=right | 5.5 km || 
|-id=173 bgcolor=#d6d6d6
| 120173 ||  || — || May 1, 2003 || Socorro || LINEAR || — || align=right | 6.8 km || 
|-id=174 bgcolor=#E9E9E9
| 120174 Jeffjenny ||  ||  || May 23, 2003 || Wrightwood || J. W. Young || EUN || align=right | 2.2 km || 
|-id=175 bgcolor=#d6d6d6
| 120175 ||  || — || May 24, 2003 || Haleakala || NEAT || 3:2 || align=right | 6.8 km || 
|-id=176 bgcolor=#d6d6d6
| 120176 ||  || — || May 26, 2003 || Kitt Peak || Spacewatch || — || align=right | 4.8 km || 
|-id=177 bgcolor=#E9E9E9
| 120177 ||  || — || June 5, 2003 || Reedy Creek || J. Broughton || — || align=right | 2.8 km || 
|-id=178 bgcolor=#C2E0FF
| 120178 ||  || — || July 26, 2003 || Palomar || M. E. Brown, C. Trujillo, D. L. Rabinowitz || Haumea || align=right | 274 km || 
|-id=179 bgcolor=#d6d6d6
| 120179 ||  || — || August 24, 2003 || Socorro || LINEAR || 3:2 || align=right | 11 km || 
|-id=180 bgcolor=#E9E9E9
| 120180 ||  || — || August 27, 2003 || Reedy Creek || J. Broughton || — || align=right | 3.4 km || 
|-id=181 bgcolor=#C2E0FF
| 120181 ||  || — || October 24, 2003 || Kitt Peak || M. W. Buie || centaur || align=right | 149 km || 
|-id=182 bgcolor=#E9E9E9
| 120182 ||  || — || November 14, 2003 || Palomar || NEAT || — || align=right | 2.7 km || 
|-id=183 bgcolor=#d6d6d6
| 120183 ||  || — || December 27, 2003 || Socorro || LINEAR || — || align=right | 8.0 km || 
|-id=184 bgcolor=#fefefe
| 120184 ||  || — || January 22, 2004 || Socorro || LINEAR || H || align=right data-sort-value="0.92" | 920 m || 
|-id=185 bgcolor=#fefefe
| 120185 ||  || — || January 30, 2004 || Socorro || LINEAR || — || align=right | 2.3 km || 
|-id=186 bgcolor=#fefefe
| 120186 Suealeman ||  ||  || January 29, 2004 || Catalina || CSS || PHO || align=right | 2.5 km || 
|-id=187 bgcolor=#d6d6d6
| 120187 ||  || — || February 10, 2004 || Palomar || NEAT || — || align=right | 4.3 km || 
|-id=188 bgcolor=#fefefe
| 120188 Amyaqueche ||  ||  || February 11, 2004 || Catalina || CSS || — || align=right | 1.4 km || 
|-id=189 bgcolor=#fefefe
| 120189 ||  || — || February 13, 2004 || Palomar || NEAT || — || align=right | 1.6 km || 
|-id=190 bgcolor=#fefefe
| 120190 ||  || — || February 13, 2004 || Kitt Peak || Spacewatch || NYS || align=right | 3.6 km || 
|-id=191 bgcolor=#fefefe
| 120191 Tombagg ||  ||  || February 15, 2004 || Catalina || CSS || — || align=right | 1.9 km || 
|-id=192 bgcolor=#E9E9E9
| 120192 ||  || — || February 14, 2004 || Palomar || NEAT || — || align=right | 4.3 km || 
|-id=193 bgcolor=#fefefe
| 120193 ||  || — || February 16, 2004 || Kitt Peak || Spacewatch || FLO || align=right | 1.3 km || 
|-id=194 bgcolor=#fefefe
| 120194 ||  || — || February 17, 2004 || Kitt Peak || Spacewatch || MAS || align=right | 1.5 km || 
|-id=195 bgcolor=#fefefe
| 120195 ||  || — || February 17, 2004 || Socorro || LINEAR || — || align=right | 1.3 km || 
|-id=196 bgcolor=#fefefe
| 120196 Kevinballou ||  ||  || February 17, 2004 || Catalina || CSS || — || align=right | 1.7 km || 
|-id=197 bgcolor=#fefefe
| 120197 ||  || — || February 19, 2004 || Socorro || LINEAR || H || align=right data-sort-value="0.94" | 940 m || 
|-id=198 bgcolor=#fefefe
| 120198 ||  || — || February 20, 2004 || Haleakala || NEAT || H || align=right | 1.1 km || 
|-id=199 bgcolor=#fefefe
| 120199 ||  || — || February 23, 2004 || Socorro || LINEAR || V || align=right | 1.2 km || 
|-id=200 bgcolor=#fefefe
| 120200 ||  || — || February 26, 2004 || Socorro || LINEAR || — || align=right | 2.6 km || 
|}

120201–120300 

|-bgcolor=#fefefe
| 120201 ||  || — || March 13, 2004 || Palomar || NEAT || — || align=right | 3.2 km || 
|-id=202 bgcolor=#fefefe
| 120202 ||  || — || March 12, 2004 || Palomar || NEAT || — || align=right | 1.4 km || 
|-id=203 bgcolor=#fefefe
| 120203 ||  || — || March 12, 2004 || Palomar || NEAT || V || align=right | 1.1 km || 
|-id=204 bgcolor=#d6d6d6
| 120204 ||  || — || March 11, 2004 || Palomar || NEAT || — || align=right | 5.1 km || 
|-id=205 bgcolor=#fefefe
| 120205 ||  || — || March 14, 2004 || Palomar || NEAT || — || align=right | 1.7 km || 
|-id=206 bgcolor=#fefefe
| 120206 ||  || — || March 15, 2004 || Kitt Peak || Spacewatch || NYS || align=right | 1.6 km || 
|-id=207 bgcolor=#fefefe
| 120207 ||  || — || March 13, 2004 || Palomar || NEAT || — || align=right | 1.7 km || 
|-id=208 bgcolor=#fefefe
| 120208 Brentbarbee ||  ||  || March 15, 2004 || Catalina || CSS || FLO || align=right | 1.3 km || 
|-id=209 bgcolor=#fefefe
| 120209 ||  || — || March 13, 2004 || Palomar || NEAT || NYS || align=right | 1.2 km || 
|-id=210 bgcolor=#E9E9E9
| 120210 ||  || — || March 15, 2004 || Kitt Peak || Spacewatch || — || align=right | 2.3 km || 
|-id=211 bgcolor=#fefefe
| 120211 ||  || — || March 15, 2004 || Kitt Peak || Spacewatch || NYS || align=right | 1.3 km || 
|-id=212 bgcolor=#fefefe
| 120212 ||  || — || March 13, 2004 || Palomar || NEAT || V || align=right | 1.1 km || 
|-id=213 bgcolor=#fefefe
| 120213 ||  || — || March 14, 2004 || Palomar || NEAT || — || align=right | 1.6 km || 
|-id=214 bgcolor=#E9E9E9
| 120214 Danteberdeguez ||  ||  || March 15, 2004 || Catalina || CSS || AGN || align=right | 2.3 km || 
|-id=215 bgcolor=#fefefe
| 120215 Kevinberry ||  ||  || March 15, 2004 || Catalina || CSS || — || align=right | 1.5 km || 
|-id=216 bgcolor=#C2E0FF
| 120216 ||  || — || March 14, 2004 || Kitt Peak || Spacewatch || plutinocritical || align=right | 211 km || 
|-id=217 bgcolor=#fefefe
| 120217 || 2004 FL || — || March 16, 2004 || Socorro || LINEAR || H || align=right | 1.3 km || 
|-id=218 bgcolor=#fefefe
| 120218 Richardberry ||  ||  || March 17, 2004 || Catalina || CSS || H || align=right | 1.2 km || 
|-id=219 bgcolor=#fefefe
| 120219 ||  || — || March 25, 2004 || Socorro || LINEAR || H || align=right | 1.4 km || 
|-id=220 bgcolor=#fefefe
| 120220 ||  || — || March 26, 2004 || Socorro || LINEAR || PHO || align=right | 2.1 km || 
|-id=221 bgcolor=#d6d6d6
| 120221 ||  || — || March 28, 2004 || Desert Eagle || W. K. Y. Yeung || — || align=right | 3.7 km || 
|-id=222 bgcolor=#fefefe
| 120222 ||  || — || March 17, 2004 || Kitt Peak || Spacewatch || MAS || align=right | 1.3 km || 
|-id=223 bgcolor=#fefefe
| 120223 ||  || — || March 28, 2004 || Socorro || LINEAR || H || align=right data-sort-value="0.92" | 920 m || 
|-id=224 bgcolor=#E9E9E9
| 120224 ||  || — || March 17, 2004 || Socorro || LINEAR || — || align=right | 1.8 km || 
|-id=225 bgcolor=#fefefe
| 120225 ||  || — || March 16, 2004 || Socorro || LINEAR || — || align=right | 1.5 km || 
|-id=226 bgcolor=#fefefe
| 120226 ||  || — || March 18, 2004 || Socorro || LINEAR || NYS || align=right | 1.1 km || 
|-id=227 bgcolor=#fefefe
| 120227 ||  || — || March 18, 2004 || Kitt Peak || Spacewatch || FLO || align=right | 1.2 km || 
|-id=228 bgcolor=#fefefe
| 120228 ||  || — || March 19, 2004 || Socorro || LINEAR || V || align=right data-sort-value="0.92" | 920 m || 
|-id=229 bgcolor=#E9E9E9
| 120229 ||  || — || March 17, 2004 || Socorro || LINEAR || JUN || align=right | 5.2 km || 
|-id=230 bgcolor=#fefefe
| 120230 ||  || — || March 19, 2004 || Socorro || LINEAR || — || align=right | 1.3 km || 
|-id=231 bgcolor=#d6d6d6
| 120231 ||  || — || March 19, 2004 || Socorro || LINEAR || — || align=right | 2.5 km || 
|-id=232 bgcolor=#fefefe
| 120232 ||  || — || March 19, 2004 || Socorro || LINEAR || V || align=right data-sort-value="0.96" | 960 m || 
|-id=233 bgcolor=#E9E9E9
| 120233 ||  || — || March 19, 2004 || Socorro || LINEAR || JUN || align=right | 2.5 km || 
|-id=234 bgcolor=#E9E9E9
| 120234 ||  || — || March 19, 2004 || Socorro || LINEAR || — || align=right | 4.9 km || 
|-id=235 bgcolor=#E9E9E9
| 120235 ||  || — || March 20, 2004 || Socorro || LINEAR || — || align=right | 1.7 km || 
|-id=236 bgcolor=#E9E9E9
| 120236 ||  || — || March 18, 2004 || Socorro || LINEAR || — || align=right | 1.9 km || 
|-id=237 bgcolor=#fefefe
| 120237 ||  || — || March 18, 2004 || Siding Spring || SSS || H || align=right | 1.1 km || 
|-id=238 bgcolor=#E9E9E9
| 120238 ||  || — || March 20, 2004 || Socorro || LINEAR || — || align=right | 3.7 km || 
|-id=239 bgcolor=#E9E9E9
| 120239 ||  || — || March 20, 2004 || Socorro || LINEAR || — || align=right | 2.4 km || 
|-id=240 bgcolor=#E9E9E9
| 120240 ||  || — || March 23, 2004 || Socorro || LINEAR || ADE || align=right | 4.0 km || 
|-id=241 bgcolor=#fefefe
| 120241 ||  || — || March 20, 2004 || Socorro || LINEAR || CIM || align=right | 3.6 km || 
|-id=242 bgcolor=#fefefe
| 120242 ||  || — || March 24, 2004 || Anderson Mesa || LONEOS || — || align=right | 1.6 km || 
|-id=243 bgcolor=#fefefe
| 120243 ||  || — || March 24, 2004 || Anderson Mesa || LONEOS || FLO || align=right | 1.2 km || 
|-id=244 bgcolor=#fefefe
| 120244 ||  || — || March 25, 2004 || Anderson Mesa || LONEOS || — || align=right | 1.3 km || 
|-id=245 bgcolor=#fefefe
| 120245 ||  || — || March 27, 2004 || Socorro || LINEAR || V || align=right | 1.1 km || 
|-id=246 bgcolor=#fefefe
| 120246 ||  || — || March 24, 2004 || Anderson Mesa || LONEOS || FLO || align=right | 1.4 km || 
|-id=247 bgcolor=#fefefe
| 120247 ||  || — || March 25, 2004 || Anderson Mesa || LONEOS || NYS || align=right | 1.1 km || 
|-id=248 bgcolor=#fefefe
| 120248 ||  || — || March 27, 2004 || Anderson Mesa || LONEOS || — || align=right | 1.3 km || 
|-id=249 bgcolor=#fefefe
| 120249 ||  || — || April 11, 2004 || Palomar || NEAT || V || align=right | 1.1 km || 
|-id=250 bgcolor=#fefefe
| 120250 ||  || — || April 11, 2004 || Palomar || NEAT || — || align=right | 1.6 km || 
|-id=251 bgcolor=#E9E9E9
| 120251 ||  || — || April 12, 2004 || Socorro || LINEAR || — || align=right | 2.7 km || 
|-id=252 bgcolor=#fefefe
| 120252 ||  || — || April 13, 2004 || Mount Graham || W. H. Ryan, Q. Jamieson || NYS || align=right | 1.1 km || 
|-id=253 bgcolor=#E9E9E9
| 120253 ||  || — || April 13, 2004 || Palomar || NEAT || — || align=right | 2.8 km || 
|-id=254 bgcolor=#fefefe
| 120254 ||  || — || April 13, 2004 || Siding Spring || SSS || — || align=right | 1.9 km || 
|-id=255 bgcolor=#fefefe
| 120255 ||  || — || April 10, 2004 || Palomar || NEAT || PHO || align=right | 2.6 km || 
|-id=256 bgcolor=#fefefe
| 120256 ||  || — || April 12, 2004 || Kitt Peak || Spacewatch || NYS || align=right | 1.0 km || 
|-id=257 bgcolor=#E9E9E9
| 120257 ||  || — || April 13, 2004 || Socorro || LINEAR || — || align=right | 2.3 km || 
|-id=258 bgcolor=#d6d6d6
| 120258 ||  || — || April 14, 2004 || Kitt Peak || Spacewatch || — || align=right | 7.6 km || 
|-id=259 bgcolor=#E9E9E9
| 120259 ||  || — || April 15, 2004 || Desert Eagle || W. K. Y. Yeung || — || align=right | 1.4 km || 
|-id=260 bgcolor=#fefefe
| 120260 ||  || — || April 9, 2004 || Siding Spring || SSS || — || align=right | 1.3 km || 
|-id=261 bgcolor=#E9E9E9
| 120261 ||  || — || April 15, 2004 || Palomar || NEAT || EUN || align=right | 2.2 km || 
|-id=262 bgcolor=#fefefe
| 120262 ||  || — || April 12, 2004 || Palomar || NEAT || FLO || align=right | 1.3 km || 
|-id=263 bgcolor=#fefefe
| 120263 ||  || — || April 12, 2004 || Palomar || NEAT || — || align=right | 1.4 km || 
|-id=264 bgcolor=#fefefe
| 120264 ||  || — || April 12, 2004 || Kitt Peak || Spacewatch || — || align=right | 1.4 km || 
|-id=265 bgcolor=#fefefe
| 120265 ||  || — || April 13, 2004 || Kitt Peak || Spacewatch || NYS || align=right data-sort-value="0.68" | 680 m || 
|-id=266 bgcolor=#fefefe
| 120266 ||  || — || April 12, 2004 || Palomar || NEAT || — || align=right | 3.1 km || 
|-id=267 bgcolor=#E9E9E9
| 120267 ||  || — || April 13, 2004 || Kitt Peak || Spacewatch || ADE || align=right | 3.2 km || 
|-id=268 bgcolor=#fefefe
| 120268 ||  || — || April 14, 2004 || Anderson Mesa || LONEOS || — || align=right | 1.4 km || 
|-id=269 bgcolor=#fefefe
| 120269 ||  || — || April 14, 2004 || Anderson Mesa || LONEOS || SVE || align=right | 3.9 km || 
|-id=270 bgcolor=#fefefe
| 120270 ||  || — || April 13, 2004 || Kitt Peak || Spacewatch || — || align=right | 1.1 km || 
|-id=271 bgcolor=#E9E9E9
| 120271 ||  || — || April 16, 2004 || Palomar || NEAT || EUN || align=right | 2.8 km || 
|-id=272 bgcolor=#fefefe
| 120272 ||  || — || April 17, 2004 || Socorro || LINEAR || V || align=right | 1.5 km || 
|-id=273 bgcolor=#E9E9E9
| 120273 ||  || — || April 17, 2004 || Socorro || LINEAR || — || align=right | 2.9 km || 
|-id=274 bgcolor=#fefefe
| 120274 ||  || — || April 17, 2004 || Socorro || LINEAR || MAS || align=right | 1.4 km || 
|-id=275 bgcolor=#fefefe
| 120275 ||  || — || April 16, 2004 || Kitt Peak || Spacewatch || FLO || align=right | 1.1 km || 
|-id=276 bgcolor=#fefefe
| 120276 ||  || — || April 17, 2004 || Socorro || LINEAR || — || align=right | 1.3 km || 
|-id=277 bgcolor=#fefefe
| 120277 ||  || — || April 17, 2004 || Socorro || LINEAR || V || align=right | 1.2 km || 
|-id=278 bgcolor=#fefefe
| 120278 ||  || — || April 16, 2004 || Siding Spring || SSS || FLO || align=right data-sort-value="0.87" | 870 m || 
|-id=279 bgcolor=#fefefe
| 120279 ||  || — || April 17, 2004 || Socorro || LINEAR || H || align=right | 1.2 km || 
|-id=280 bgcolor=#fefefe
| 120280 ||  || — || April 20, 2004 || Socorro || LINEAR || FLO || align=right | 1.3 km || 
|-id=281 bgcolor=#fefefe
| 120281 ||  || — || April 21, 2004 || Socorro || LINEAR || — || align=right | 1.1 km || 
|-id=282 bgcolor=#E9E9E9
| 120282 ||  || — || April 16, 2004 || Palomar || NEAT || — || align=right | 3.2 km || 
|-id=283 bgcolor=#E9E9E9
| 120283 ||  || — || April 20, 2004 || Socorro || LINEAR || NEM || align=right | 3.0 km || 
|-id=284 bgcolor=#fefefe
| 120284 ||  || — || April 21, 2004 || Kitt Peak || Spacewatch || NYS || align=right data-sort-value="0.95" | 950 m || 
|-id=285 bgcolor=#E9E9E9
| 120285 Brentbos ||  ||  || April 22, 2004 || Catalina || CSS || MAR || align=right | 2.5 km || 
|-id=286 bgcolor=#d6d6d6
| 120286 ||  || — || April 27, 2004 || Socorro || LINEAR || Tj (2.94) || align=right | 6.3 km || 
|-id=287 bgcolor=#d6d6d6
| 120287 ||  || — || April 25, 2004 || Kitt Peak || Spacewatch || 3:2 || align=right | 8.3 km || 
|-id=288 bgcolor=#fefefe
| 120288 ||  || — || April 25, 2004 || Socorro || LINEAR || — || align=right | 1.7 km || 
|-id=289 bgcolor=#fefefe
| 120289 ||  || — || April 25, 2004 || Socorro || LINEAR || FLO || align=right data-sort-value="0.95" | 950 m || 
|-id=290 bgcolor=#E9E9E9
| 120290 ||  || — || April 29, 2004 || Socorro || LINEAR || — || align=right | 2.0 km || 
|-id=291 bgcolor=#d6d6d6
| 120291 ||  || — || April 30, 2004 || Kitt Peak || Spacewatch || HYG || align=right | 6.4 km || 
|-id=292 bgcolor=#fefefe
| 120292 ||  || — || May 13, 2004 || Palomar || NEAT || NYS || align=right data-sort-value="0.79" | 790 m || 
|-id=293 bgcolor=#E9E9E9
| 120293 ||  || — || May 13, 2004 || Kitt Peak || Spacewatch || — || align=right | 2.8 km || 
|-id=294 bgcolor=#E9E9E9
| 120294 ||  || — || May 10, 2004 || Palomar || NEAT || — || align=right | 2.4 km || 
|-id=295 bgcolor=#E9E9E9
| 120295 ||  || — || May 11, 2004 || Anderson Mesa || LONEOS || — || align=right | 2.5 km || 
|-id=296 bgcolor=#fefefe
| 120296 ||  || — || May 12, 2004 || Siding Spring || SSS || V || align=right | 1.2 km || 
|-id=297 bgcolor=#fefefe
| 120297 ||  || — || May 9, 2004 || Kitt Peak || Spacewatch || — || align=right | 1.8 km || 
|-id=298 bgcolor=#E9E9E9
| 120298 ||  || — || May 15, 2004 || Socorro || LINEAR || — || align=right | 4.2 km || 
|-id=299 bgcolor=#fefefe
| 120299 Billlynch ||  ||  || May 9, 2004 || Sandlot || G. Hug || V || align=right | 1.2 km || 
|-id=300 bgcolor=#E9E9E9
| 120300 ||  || — || May 14, 2004 || Socorro || LINEAR || EUN || align=right | 2.4 km || 
|}

120301–120400 

|-bgcolor=#fefefe
| 120301 ||  || — || May 15, 2004 || Socorro || LINEAR || — || align=right | 1.0 km || 
|-id=302 bgcolor=#fefefe
| 120302 ||  || — || May 13, 2004 || Anderson Mesa || LONEOS || — || align=right data-sort-value="0.93" | 930 m || 
|-id=303 bgcolor=#E9E9E9
| 120303 ||  || — || May 14, 2004 || Socorro || LINEAR || — || align=right | 3.0 km || 
|-id=304 bgcolor=#fefefe
| 120304 ||  || — || May 9, 2004 || Kitt Peak || Spacewatch || NYS || align=right data-sort-value="0.96" | 960 m || 
|-id=305 bgcolor=#fefefe
| 120305 || 2004 KF || — || May 16, 2004 || Reedy Creek || J. Broughton || — || align=right | 1.5 km || 
|-id=306 bgcolor=#E9E9E9
| 120306 ||  || — || May 17, 2004 || Socorro || LINEAR || — || align=right | 1.9 km || 
|-id=307 bgcolor=#fefefe
| 120307 ||  || — || May 19, 2004 || Socorro || LINEAR || V || align=right | 1.3 km || 
|-id=308 bgcolor=#d6d6d6
| 120308 Deebradel ||  ||  || May 22, 2004 || Catalina || CSS || — || align=right | 4.2 km || 
|-id=309 bgcolor=#E9E9E9
| 120309 ||  || — || May 23, 2004 || Socorro || LINEAR || — || align=right | 4.1 km || 
|-id=310 bgcolor=#E9E9E9
| 120310 ||  || — || May 24, 2004 || Socorro || LINEAR || — || align=right | 2.4 km || 
|-id=311 bgcolor=#E9E9E9
| 120311 ||  || — || June 11, 2004 || Palomar || NEAT || — || align=right | 3.9 km || 
|-id=312 bgcolor=#E9E9E9
| 120312 ||  || — || June 5, 2004 || Palomar || NEAT || — || align=right | 2.8 km || 
|-id=313 bgcolor=#E9E9E9
| 120313 ||  || — || June 11, 2004 || Socorro || LINEAR || — || align=right | 4.2 km || 
|-id=314 bgcolor=#E9E9E9
| 120314 ||  || — || June 11, 2004 || Kitt Peak || Spacewatch || EUN || align=right | 2.6 km || 
|-id=315 bgcolor=#d6d6d6
| 120315 ||  || — || June 12, 2004 || Kitt Peak || Spacewatch || BRA || align=right | 2.9 km || 
|-id=316 bgcolor=#E9E9E9
| 120316 ||  || — || June 12, 2004 || Palomar || NEAT || EUN || align=right | 2.2 km || 
|-id=317 bgcolor=#E9E9E9
| 120317 ||  || — || June 11, 2004 || Socorro || LINEAR || ADE || align=right | 4.3 km || 
|-id=318 bgcolor=#E9E9E9
| 120318 ||  || — || June 11, 2004 || Socorro || LINEAR || — || align=right | 2.1 km || 
|-id=319 bgcolor=#E9E9E9
| 120319 ||  || — || June 12, 2004 || Socorro || LINEAR || — || align=right | 2.1 km || 
|-id=320 bgcolor=#E9E9E9
| 120320 ||  || — || June 14, 2004 || Socorro || LINEAR || ADE || align=right | 3.5 km || 
|-id=321 bgcolor=#E9E9E9
| 120321 ||  || — || June 13, 2004 || Socorro || LINEAR || — || align=right | 5.1 km || 
|-id=322 bgcolor=#E9E9E9
| 120322 ||  || — || June 17, 2004 || Palomar || NEAT || GEF || align=right | 2.0 km || 
|-id=323 bgcolor=#E9E9E9
| 120323 ||  || — || June 18, 2004 || Socorro || LINEAR || — || align=right | 1.7 km || 
|-id=324 bgcolor=#E9E9E9
| 120324 Falusandrás ||  ||  || June 21, 2004 || Piszkéstető || K. Sárneczky || — || align=right | 1.3 km || 
|-id=325 bgcolor=#E9E9E9
| 120325 ||  || — || June 26, 2004 || Kitt Peak || Spacewatch || ADE || align=right | 3.7 km || 
|-id=326 bgcolor=#d6d6d6
| 120326 ||  || — || July 9, 2004 || Reedy Creek || J. Broughton || KOR || align=right | 2.5 km || 
|-id=327 bgcolor=#d6d6d6
| 120327 ||  || — || July 9, 2004 || Siding Spring || SSS || — || align=right | 5.1 km || 
|-id=328 bgcolor=#fefefe
| 120328 ||  || — || July 11, 2004 || Socorro || LINEAR || — || align=right | 2.8 km || 
|-id=329 bgcolor=#d6d6d6
| 120329 ||  || — || July 11, 2004 || Socorro || LINEAR || SHU3:2 || align=right | 9.8 km || 
|-id=330 bgcolor=#d6d6d6
| 120330 ||  || — || July 11, 2004 || Socorro || LINEAR || — || align=right | 2.9 km || 
|-id=331 bgcolor=#d6d6d6
| 120331 ||  || — || July 11, 2004 || Socorro || LINEAR || HYG || align=right | 3.3 km || 
|-id=332 bgcolor=#E9E9E9
| 120332 ||  || — || July 16, 2004 || Socorro || LINEAR || — || align=right | 3.7 km || 
|-id=333 bgcolor=#E9E9E9
| 120333 ||  || — || July 27, 2004 || Socorro || LINEAR || — || align=right | 3.1 km || 
|-id=334 bgcolor=#d6d6d6
| 120334 ||  || — || July 16, 2004 || Socorro || LINEAR || HYG || align=right | 5.2 km || 
|-id=335 bgcolor=#d6d6d6
| 120335 ||  || — || July 17, 2004 || Palomar || NEAT || — || align=right | 5.1 km || 
|-id=336 bgcolor=#d6d6d6
| 120336 ||  || — || August 8, 2004 || Socorro || LINEAR || 3:2 || align=right | 8.2 km || 
|-id=337 bgcolor=#E9E9E9
| 120337 ||  || — || August 9, 2004 || Socorro || LINEAR || MAR || align=right | 2.0 km || 
|-id=338 bgcolor=#d6d6d6
| 120338 ||  || — || August 10, 2004 || Anderson Mesa || LONEOS || ALA || align=right | 7.7 km || 
|-id=339 bgcolor=#d6d6d6
| 120339 ||  || — || August 8, 2004 || Socorro || LINEAR || KOR || align=right | 2.3 km || 
|-id=340 bgcolor=#d6d6d6
| 120340 ||  || — || August 14, 2004 || Palomar || NEAT || — || align=right | 4.6 km || 
|-id=341 bgcolor=#d6d6d6
| 120341 ||  || — || August 21, 2004 || Siding Spring || SSS || EOS || align=right | 4.2 km || 
|-id=342 bgcolor=#E9E9E9
| 120342 ||  || — || September 7, 2004 || Socorro || LINEAR || — || align=right | 3.4 km || 
|-id=343 bgcolor=#d6d6d6
| 120343 ||  || — || September 8, 2004 || Socorro || LINEAR || — || align=right | 4.3 km || 
|-id=344 bgcolor=#d6d6d6
| 120344 ||  || — || September 9, 2004 || Socorro || LINEAR || KOR || align=right | 2.7 km || 
|-id=345 bgcolor=#d6d6d6
| 120345 ||  || — || September 10, 2004 || Socorro || LINEAR || EOS || align=right | 4.2 km || 
|-id=346 bgcolor=#d6d6d6
| 120346 ||  || — || September 13, 2004 || Socorro || LINEAR || — || align=right | 6.1 km || 
|-id=347 bgcolor=#C2E0FF
| 120347 Salacia ||  ||  || September 22, 2004 || Palomar || H. G. Roe, M. E. Brown, K. M. Barkume || other TNOmoon || align=right | 612 km || 
|-id=348 bgcolor=#C2E0FF
| 120348 ||  || — || October 3, 2004 || Palomar || M. E. Brown, C. Trujillo, D. L. Rabinowitz || other TNO || align=right | 579 km || 
|-id=349 bgcolor=#d6d6d6
| 120349 Kalas ||  ||  || December 12, 2004 || Jarnac || Jarnac Obs. || — || align=right | 5.0 km || 
|-id=350 bgcolor=#fefefe
| 120350 Richburns ||  ||  || May 3, 2005 || Catalina || CSS || V || align=right | 1.3 km || 
|-id=351 bgcolor=#fefefe
| 120351 Beckymasterson ||  ||  || May 14, 2005 || Catalina || CSS || — || align=right | 2.1 km || 
|-id=352 bgcolor=#FA8072
| 120352 Gordonwong ||  ||  || May 13, 2005 || Catalina || CSS || — || align=right | 1.7 km || 
|-id=353 bgcolor=#fefefe
| 120353 Katrinajackson ||  ||  || June 4, 2005 || Catalina || CSS || ERI || align=right | 2.4 km || 
|-id=354 bgcolor=#fefefe
| 120354 Mikejones ||  ||  || June 13, 2005 || Mount Lemmon || Mount Lemmon Survey || — || align=right | 1.1 km || 
|-id=355 bgcolor=#fefefe
| 120355 ||  || — || June 16, 2005 || Catalina || CSS || PHO || align=right | 3.3 km || 
|-id=356 bgcolor=#fefefe
| 120356 ||  || — || June 28, 2005 || Palomar || NEAT || — || align=right | 1.6 km || 
|-id=357 bgcolor=#fefefe
| 120357 ||  || — || June 30, 2005 || Anderson Mesa || LONEOS || FLO || align=right | 1.1 km || 
|-id=358 bgcolor=#fefefe
| 120358 ||  || — || June 30, 2005 || Kitt Peak || Spacewatch || NYS || align=right | 1.2 km || 
|-id=359 bgcolor=#fefefe
| 120359 ||  || — || June 30, 2005 || Palomar || NEAT || — || align=right | 1.8 km || 
|-id=360 bgcolor=#d6d6d6
| 120360 ||  || — || June 27, 2005 || Palomar || NEAT || 7:4 || align=right | 6.2 km || 
|-id=361 bgcolor=#E9E9E9
| 120361 Guido || 2005 NZ ||  || July 3, 2005 || New Mexico Skies || A. Lowe || — || align=right | 3.9 km || 
|-id=362 bgcolor=#fefefe
| 120362 ||  || — || July 1, 2005 || Kitt Peak || Spacewatch || — || align=right | 1.7 km || 
|-id=363 bgcolor=#d6d6d6
| 120363 ||  || — || July 3, 2005 || Palomar || NEAT || HIL || align=right | 10 km || 
|-id=364 bgcolor=#E9E9E9
| 120364 Stevecooley ||  ||  || July 3, 2005 || Catalina || CSS || MAR || align=right | 2.2 km || 
|-id=365 bgcolor=#fefefe
| 120365 ||  || — || July 7, 2005 || Anderson Mesa || LONEOS || — || align=right | 1.8 km || 
|-id=366 bgcolor=#fefefe
| 120366 ||  || — || July 5, 2005 || Siding Spring || SSS || — || align=right | 2.3 km || 
|-id=367 bgcolor=#fefefe
| 120367 Grabow ||  ||  || July 2, 2005 || Catalina || CSS || FLO || align=right | 2.1 km || 
|-id=368 bgcolor=#E9E9E9
| 120368 Phillipcoulter ||  ||  || July 3, 2005 || Catalina || CSS || JUN || align=right | 1.7 km || 
|-id=369 bgcolor=#fefefe
| 120369 ||  || — || July 6, 2005 || Kitt Peak || Spacewatch || NYSfast? || align=right data-sort-value="0.81" | 810 m || 
|-id=370 bgcolor=#fefefe
| 120370 ||  || — || July 26, 2005 || Palomar || NEAT || H || align=right | 1.2 km || 
|-id=371 bgcolor=#fefefe
| 120371 ||  || — || July 29, 2005 || Palomar || NEAT || NYS || align=right | 1.4 km || 
|-id=372 bgcolor=#fefefe
| 120372 || 2005 PY || — || August 1, 2005 || Siding Spring || SSS || V || align=right | 1.2 km || 
|-id=373 bgcolor=#E9E9E9
| 120373 ||  || — || August 1, 2005 || Siding Spring || SSS || GER || align=right | 2.9 km || 
|-id=374 bgcolor=#fefefe
| 120374 ||  || — || August 1, 2005 || Siding Spring || SSS || — || align=right | 4.1 km || 
|-id=375 bgcolor=#fefefe
| 120375 Kugel ||  ||  || August 10, 2005 || Ottmarsheim || C. Rinner || — || align=right | 1.3 km || 
|-id=376 bgcolor=#fefefe
| 120376 ||  || — || August 4, 2005 || Palomar || NEAT || — || align=right | 1.8 km || 
|-id=377 bgcolor=#d6d6d6
| 120377 ||  || — || August 4, 2005 || Palomar || NEAT || KOR || align=right | 2.9 km || 
|-id=378 bgcolor=#E9E9E9
| 120378 ||  || — || August 25, 2005 || Palomar || NEAT || — || align=right | 2.2 km || 
|-id=379 bgcolor=#d6d6d6
| 120379 ||  || — || August 24, 2005 || Palomar || NEAT || HYG || align=right | 4.1 km || 
|-id=380 bgcolor=#fefefe
| 120380 ||  || — || August 25, 2005 || Palomar || NEAT || NYS || align=right | 1.3 km || 
|-id=381 bgcolor=#E9E9E9
| 120381 ||  || — || August 27, 2005 || Anderson Mesa || LONEOS || — || align=right | 4.5 km || 
|-id=382 bgcolor=#E9E9E9
| 120382 ||  || — || August 27, 2005 || Kitt Peak || Spacewatch || — || align=right | 1.1 km || 
|-id=383 bgcolor=#d6d6d6
| 120383 ||  || — || August 27, 2005 || Kitt Peak || Spacewatch || — || align=right | 6.9 km || 
|-id=384 bgcolor=#fefefe
| 120384 ||  || — || August 26, 2005 || Anderson Mesa || LONEOS || NYS || align=right | 2.8 km || 
|-id=385 bgcolor=#d6d6d6
| 120385 ||  || — || August 25, 2005 || Palomar || NEAT || EOS || align=right | 3.2 km || 
|-id=386 bgcolor=#E9E9E9
| 120386 ||  || — || August 25, 2005 || Palomar || NEAT || — || align=right | 2.4 km || 
|-id=387 bgcolor=#fefefe
| 120387 ||  || — || August 25, 2005 || Palomar || NEAT || NYS || align=right | 1.2 km || 
|-id=388 bgcolor=#d6d6d6
| 120388 ||  || — || August 26, 2005 || Anderson Mesa || LONEOS || — || align=right | 5.3 km || 
|-id=389 bgcolor=#d6d6d6
| 120389 ||  || — || August 26, 2005 || Anderson Mesa || LONEOS || EOS || align=right | 2.9 km || 
|-id=390 bgcolor=#fefefe
| 120390 ||  || — || August 26, 2005 || Anderson Mesa || LONEOS || V || align=right | 1.2 km || 
|-id=391 bgcolor=#d6d6d6
| 120391 ||  || — || August 28, 2005 || Anderson Mesa || LONEOS || — || align=right | 5.9 km || 
|-id=392 bgcolor=#fefefe
| 120392 ||  || — || August 30, 2005 || Kitt Peak || Spacewatch || — || align=right | 1.4 km || 
|-id=393 bgcolor=#fefefe
| 120393 ||  || — || August 30, 2005 || Socorro || LINEAR || H || align=right | 1.1 km || 
|-id=394 bgcolor=#d6d6d6
| 120394 ||  || — || August 27, 2005 || Palomar || NEAT || MEL || align=right | 3.5 km || 
|-id=395 bgcolor=#fefefe
| 120395 ||  || — || August 27, 2005 || Palomar || NEAT || V || align=right | 1.4 km || 
|-id=396 bgcolor=#fefefe
| 120396 ||  || — || August 27, 2005 || Palomar || NEAT || NYS || align=right | 1.2 km || 
|-id=397 bgcolor=#E9E9E9
| 120397 ||  || — || August 27, 2005 || Palomar || NEAT || — || align=right | 4.6 km || 
|-id=398 bgcolor=#fefefe
| 120398 ||  || — || August 30, 2005 || Socorro || LINEAR || — || align=right | 1.2 km || 
|-id=399 bgcolor=#E9E9E9
| 120399 ||  || — || August 30, 2005 || Palomar || NEAT || — || align=right | 5.2 km || 
|-id=400 bgcolor=#d6d6d6
| 120400 ||  || — || August 28, 2005 || Kitt Peak || Spacewatch || — || align=right | 4.7 km || 
|}

120401–120500 

|-bgcolor=#fefefe
| 120401 ||  || — || September 3, 2005 || Palomar || NEAT || — || align=right | 1.3 km || 
|-id=402 bgcolor=#d6d6d6
| 120402 ||  || — || September 8, 2005 || Socorro || LINEAR || — || align=right | 4.5 km || 
|-id=403 bgcolor=#E9E9E9
| 120403 ||  || — || September 11, 2005 || Anderson Mesa || LONEOS || EUN || align=right | 2.5 km || 
|-id=404 bgcolor=#fefefe
| 120404 ||  || — || September 14, 2005 || Kitt Peak || Spacewatch || NYS || align=right | 1.1 km || 
|-id=405 bgcolor=#E9E9E9
| 120405 Svyatylivka ||  ||  || September 24, 2005 || Andrushivka || O. Geraščenko, Y. Ivaščenko || — || align=right | 2.3 km || 
|-id=406 bgcolor=#E9E9E9
| 120406 ||  || — || September 26, 2005 || Kitt Peak || Spacewatch || — || align=right | 1.8 km || 
|-id=407 bgcolor=#fefefe
| 120407 ||  || — || September 25, 2005 || Kitt Peak || Spacewatch || — || align=right | 1.3 km || 
|-id=408 bgcolor=#d6d6d6
| 120408 ||  || — || September 24, 2005 || Kitt Peak || Spacewatch || — || align=right | 4.4 km || 
|-id=409 bgcolor=#fefefe
| 120409 || 2178 P-L || — || September 24, 1960 || Palomar || PLS || — || align=right | 1.4 km || 
|-id=410 bgcolor=#fefefe
| 120410 || 2225 P-L || — || September 24, 1960 || Palomar || PLS || V || align=right | 1.4 km || 
|-id=411 bgcolor=#E9E9E9
| 120411 || 2857 P-L || — || September 24, 1960 || Palomar || PLS || — || align=right | 2.3 km || 
|-id=412 bgcolor=#E9E9E9
| 120412 || 3017 P-L || — || September 24, 1960 || Palomar || PLS || — || align=right | 6.5 km || 
|-id=413 bgcolor=#E9E9E9
| 120413 || 4815 P-L || — || September 24, 1960 || Palomar || PLS || — || align=right | 1.8 km || 
|-id=414 bgcolor=#FA8072
| 120414 || 4880 P-L || — || September 24, 1960 || Palomar || PLS || — || align=right | 1.5 km || 
|-id=415 bgcolor=#E9E9E9
| 120415 || 6057 P-L || — || September 24, 1960 || Palomar || PLS || — || align=right | 2.4 km || 
|-id=416 bgcolor=#fefefe
| 120416 || 6123 P-L || — || September 24, 1960 || Palomar || PLS || — || align=right | 1.6 km || 
|-id=417 bgcolor=#E9E9E9
| 120417 || 6264 P-L || — || September 24, 1960 || Palomar || PLS || — || align=right | 2.8 km || 
|-id=418 bgcolor=#d6d6d6
| 120418 || 6633 P-L || — || September 24, 1960 || Palomar || PLS || — || align=right | 4.0 km || 
|-id=419 bgcolor=#fefefe
| 120419 || 2308 T-1 || — || March 25, 1971 || Palomar || PLS || — || align=right | 1.6 km || 
|-id=420 bgcolor=#fefefe
| 120420 || 4133 T-1 || — || March 26, 1971 || Palomar || PLS || — || align=right | 1.2 km || 
|-id=421 bgcolor=#E9E9E9
| 120421 || 1604 T-2 || — || September 24, 1973 || Palomar || PLS || — || align=right | 1.9 km || 
|-id=422 bgcolor=#fefefe
| 120422 || 2023 T-2 || — || September 29, 1973 || Palomar || PLS || — || align=right | 1.0 km || 
|-id=423 bgcolor=#fefefe
| 120423 || 2061 T-2 || — || September 29, 1973 || Palomar || PLS || — || align=right | 1.1 km || 
|-id=424 bgcolor=#E9E9E9
| 120424 || 2099 T-2 || — || September 29, 1973 || Palomar || PLS || — || align=right | 3.8 km || 
|-id=425 bgcolor=#d6d6d6
| 120425 || 2113 T-2 || — || September 29, 1973 || Palomar || PLS || — || align=right | 3.8 km || 
|-id=426 bgcolor=#fefefe
| 120426 || 3080 T-2 || — || September 30, 1973 || Palomar || PLS || — || align=right | 1.4 km || 
|-id=427 bgcolor=#d6d6d6
| 120427 || 1155 T-3 || — || October 17, 1977 || Palomar || PLS || — || align=right | 5.4 km || 
|-id=428 bgcolor=#d6d6d6
| 120428 || 2128 T-3 || — || October 16, 1977 || Palomar || PLS || — || align=right | 6.6 km || 
|-id=429 bgcolor=#fefefe
| 120429 || 2225 T-3 || — || October 16, 1977 || Palomar || PLS || — || align=right | 1.3 km || 
|-id=430 bgcolor=#fefefe
| 120430 || 2303 T-3 || — || October 16, 1977 || Palomar || PLS || FLO || align=right | 1.2 km || 
|-id=431 bgcolor=#E9E9E9
| 120431 || 2448 T-3 || — || October 16, 1977 || Palomar || PLS || MRX || align=right | 2.3 km || 
|-id=432 bgcolor=#d6d6d6
| 120432 || 2614 T-3 || — || October 16, 1977 || Palomar || PLS || — || align=right | 6.3 km || 
|-id=433 bgcolor=#d6d6d6
| 120433 || 3132 T-3 || — || October 16, 1977 || Palomar || PLS || URS || align=right | 5.9 km || 
|-id=434 bgcolor=#d6d6d6
| 120434 || 3202 T-3 || — || October 16, 1977 || Palomar || PLS || — || align=right | 7.6 km || 
|-id=435 bgcolor=#d6d6d6
| 120435 || 3310 T-3 || — || October 16, 1977 || Palomar || PLS || — || align=right | 4.2 km || 
|-id=436 bgcolor=#E9E9E9
| 120436 || 4589 T-3 || — || October 16, 1977 || Palomar || PLS || AEO || align=right | 2.8 km || 
|-id=437 bgcolor=#E9E9E9
| 120437 || 5101 T-3 || — || October 16, 1977 || Palomar || PLS || CLO || align=right | 7.6 km || 
|-id=438 bgcolor=#fefefe
| 120438 || 1978 NU || — || July 7, 1978 || Palomar || J. G. Williams || CHL || align=right | 4.3 km || 
|-id=439 bgcolor=#fefefe
| 120439 ||  || — || November 7, 1978 || Palomar || E. F. Helin, S. J. Bus || — || align=right | 1.6 km || 
|-id=440 bgcolor=#fefefe
| 120440 ||  || — || November 7, 1978 || Palomar || E. F. Helin, S. J. Bus || NYS || align=right | 3.9 km || 
|-id=441 bgcolor=#fefefe
| 120441 ||  || — || June 25, 1979 || Siding Spring || E. F. Helin, S. J. Bus || NYS || align=right | 2.2 km || 
|-id=442 bgcolor=#E9E9E9
| 120442 || 1981 DW || — || February 28, 1981 || Siding Spring || S. J. Bus || — || align=right | 3.0 km || 
|-id=443 bgcolor=#E9E9E9
| 120443 ||  || — || February 28, 1981 || Siding Spring || S. J. Bus || — || align=right | 3.0 km || 
|-id=444 bgcolor=#E9E9E9
| 120444 ||  || — || March 1, 1981 || Siding Spring || S. J. Bus || — || align=right | 4.8 km || 
|-id=445 bgcolor=#fefefe
| 120445 ||  || — || March 6, 1981 || Siding Spring || S. J. Bus || ERI || align=right | 3.0 km || 
|-id=446 bgcolor=#E9E9E9
| 120446 ||  || — || March 2, 1981 || Siding Spring || S. J. Bus || — || align=right | 3.5 km || 
|-id=447 bgcolor=#fefefe
| 120447 ||  || — || March 7, 1981 || Siding Spring || S. J. Bus || — || align=right | 2.1 km || 
|-id=448 bgcolor=#d6d6d6
| 120448 ||  || — || March 3, 1981 || Siding Spring || S. J. Bus || — || align=right | 5.0 km || 
|-id=449 bgcolor=#fefefe
| 120449 ||  || — || March 6, 1981 || Siding Spring || S. J. Bus || V || align=right | 1.3 km || 
|-id=450 bgcolor=#FA8072
| 120450 || 1982 SV || — || September 20, 1982 || Palomar || E. F. Helin || — || align=right | 1.9 km || 
|-id=451 bgcolor=#fefefe
| 120451 || 1983 QU || — || August 30, 1983 || Palomar || J. Gibson || — || align=right | 1.1 km || 
|-id=452 bgcolor=#E9E9E9
| 120452 Schombert || 1988 NA ||  || July 6, 1988 || Palomar || A. Maury || — || align=right | 5.0 km || 
|-id=453 bgcolor=#C2FFFF
| 120453 ||  || — || September 14, 1988 || Cerro Tololo || S. J. Bus || L5 || align=right | 12 km || 
|-id=454 bgcolor=#C2FFFF
| 120454 ||  || — || September 16, 1988 || Cerro Tololo || S. J. Bus || L5 || align=right | 17 km || 
|-id=455 bgcolor=#E9E9E9
| 120455 ||  || — || April 3, 1989 || La Silla || E. W. Elst || ADE || align=right | 4.0 km || 
|-id=456 bgcolor=#fefefe
| 120456 || 1989 JB || — || May 3, 1989 || Palomar || E. F. Helin || — || align=right | 2.3 km || 
|-id=457 bgcolor=#fefefe
| 120457 ||  || — || August 28, 1990 || Palomar || H. E. Holt || NYS || align=right | 1.7 km || 
|-id=458 bgcolor=#fefefe
| 120458 ||  || — || September 22, 1990 || La Silla || E. W. Elst || — || align=right | 1.7 km || 
|-id=459 bgcolor=#fefefe
| 120459 ||  || — || September 22, 1990 || La Silla || E. W. Elst || — || align=right | 2.8 km || 
|-id=460 bgcolor=#fefefe
| 120460 Hambach ||  ||  || October 13, 1990 || Tautenburg Observatory || F. Börngen, L. D. Schmadel || — || align=right | 1.6 km || 
|-id=461 bgcolor=#fefefe
| 120461 Gandhi ||  ||  || October 10, 1990 || Tautenburg Observatory || F. Börngen, L. D. Schmadel || FLO || align=right data-sort-value="0.98" | 980 m || 
|-id=462 bgcolor=#fefefe
| 120462 Amanohashidate ||  ||  || October 26, 1990 || Geisei || T. Seki || ERI || align=right | 4.4 km || 
|-id=463 bgcolor=#fefefe
| 120463 ||  || — || April 8, 1991 || La Silla || E. W. Elst || — || align=right | 2.6 km || 
|-id=464 bgcolor=#fefefe
| 120464 ||  || — || August 6, 1991 || La Silla || E. W. Elst || — || align=right | 1.4 km || 
|-id=465 bgcolor=#E9E9E9
| 120465 ||  || — || October 6, 1991 || Palomar || A. Lowe || — || align=right | 4.5 km || 
|-id=466 bgcolor=#E9E9E9
| 120466 ||  || — || November 3, 1991 || Kitt Peak || Spacewatch || — || align=right | 3.5 km || 
|-id=467 bgcolor=#E9E9E9
| 120467 ||  || — || November 4, 1991 || Kitt Peak || Spacewatch || HEN || align=right | 1.9 km || 
|-id=468 bgcolor=#E9E9E9
| 120468 ||  || — || November 4, 1991 || Kitt Peak || Spacewatch || HEN || align=right | 1.6 km || 
|-id=469 bgcolor=#fefefe
| 120469 ||  || — || February 29, 1992 || La Silla || UESAC || — || align=right | 1.5 km || 
|-id=470 bgcolor=#fefefe
| 120470 ||  || — || February 29, 1992 || La Silla || UESAC || — || align=right | 1.5 km || 
|-id=471 bgcolor=#fefefe
| 120471 ||  || — || March 6, 1992 || Kitt Peak || Spacewatch || — || align=right | 1.1 km || 
|-id=472 bgcolor=#fefefe
| 120472 ||  || — || March 1, 1992 || La Silla || UESAC || — || align=right | 1.5 km || 
|-id=473 bgcolor=#d6d6d6
| 120473 ||  || — || March 2, 1992 || La Silla || UESAC || — || align=right | 4.8 km || 
|-id=474 bgcolor=#fefefe
| 120474 ||  || — || March 2, 1992 || La Silla || UESAC || NYS || align=right | 1.4 km || 
|-id=475 bgcolor=#fefefe
| 120475 ||  || — || March 1, 1992 || La Silla || UESAC || FLO || align=right | 1.1 km || 
|-id=476 bgcolor=#fefefe
| 120476 ||  || — || March 1, 1992 || La Silla || UESAC || — || align=right | 1.2 km || 
|-id=477 bgcolor=#fefefe
| 120477 ||  || — || July 30, 1992 || La Silla || E. W. Elst || — || align=right | 4.3 km || 
|-id=478 bgcolor=#fefefe
| 120478 || 1992 QS || — || August 29, 1992 || Palomar || E. F. Helin || — || align=right | 2.4 km || 
|-id=479 bgcolor=#fefefe
| 120479 ||  || — || September 2, 1992 || La Silla || E. W. Elst || — || align=right | 2.1 km || 
|-id=480 bgcolor=#E9E9E9
| 120480 ||  || — || September 2, 1992 || La Silla || E. W. Elst || — || align=right | 1.7 km || 
|-id=481 bgcolor=#fefefe
| 120481 Johannwalter ||  ||  || September 24, 1992 || Tautenburg Observatory || F. Börngen, L. D. Schmadel || NYS || align=right | 1.7 km || 
|-id=482 bgcolor=#FA8072
| 120482 || 1992 TA || — || October 2, 1992 || Kitt Peak || Spacewatch || — || align=right | 1.2 km || 
|-id=483 bgcolor=#E9E9E9
| 120483 ||  || — || January 21, 1993 || Kitt Peak || Spacewatch || MIS || align=right | 3.9 km || 
|-id=484 bgcolor=#E9E9E9
| 120484 ||  || — || March 17, 1993 || La Silla || UESAC || — || align=right | 3.5 km || 
|-id=485 bgcolor=#fefefe
| 120485 ||  || — || March 17, 1993 || La Silla || UESAC || — || align=right | 1.2 km || 
|-id=486 bgcolor=#E9E9E9
| 120486 ||  || — || March 17, 1993 || La Silla || UESAC || MRX || align=right | 2.2 km || 
|-id=487 bgcolor=#E9E9E9
| 120487 ||  || — || March 17, 1993 || La Silla || UESAC || — || align=right | 3.7 km || 
|-id=488 bgcolor=#E9E9E9
| 120488 ||  || — || March 19, 1993 || La Silla || UESAC || — || align=right | 3.2 km || 
|-id=489 bgcolor=#E9E9E9
| 120489 ||  || — || March 17, 1993 || La Silla || UESAC || — || align=right | 4.2 km || 
|-id=490 bgcolor=#E9E9E9
| 120490 ||  || — || March 21, 1993 || La Silla || UESAC || — || align=right | 2.9 km || 
|-id=491 bgcolor=#fefefe
| 120491 ||  || — || March 21, 1993 || La Silla || UESAC || FLO || align=right | 1.2 km || 
|-id=492 bgcolor=#fefefe
| 120492 ||  || — || March 21, 1993 || La Silla || UESAC || — || align=right | 1.5 km || 
|-id=493 bgcolor=#E9E9E9
| 120493 ||  || — || March 19, 1993 || La Silla || UESAC || — || align=right | 4.1 km || 
|-id=494 bgcolor=#E9E9E9
| 120494 ||  || — || March 19, 1993 || La Silla || UESAC || — || align=right | 3.9 km || 
|-id=495 bgcolor=#E9E9E9
| 120495 ||  || — || March 19, 1993 || La Silla || UESAC || — || align=right | 3.5 km || 
|-id=496 bgcolor=#fefefe
| 120496 ||  || — || March 19, 1993 || La Silla || UESAC || — || align=right | 1.7 km || 
|-id=497 bgcolor=#fefefe
| 120497 ||  || — || March 19, 1993 || La Silla || UESAC || NYS || align=right | 1.5 km || 
|-id=498 bgcolor=#E9E9E9
| 120498 ||  || — || March 17, 1993 || La Silla || UESAC || — || align=right | 3.7 km || 
|-id=499 bgcolor=#fefefe
| 120499 || 1993 NA || — || July 9, 1993 || Stroncone || A. Vagnozzi || — || align=right | 1.3 km || 
|-id=500 bgcolor=#d6d6d6
| 120500 || 1993 OM || — || July 24, 1993 || Stroncone || A. Vagnozzi || — || align=right | 5.2 km || 
|}

120501–120600 

|-bgcolor=#fefefe
| 120501 ||  || — || August 15, 1993 || Caussols || E. W. Elst || ERI || align=right | 3.0 km || 
|-id=502 bgcolor=#fefefe
| 120502 ||  || — || August 20, 1993 || La Silla || E. W. Elst || — || align=right | 1.3 km || 
|-id=503 bgcolor=#E9E9E9
| 120503 ||  || — || September 12, 1993 || Palomar || PCAS || — || align=right | 2.4 km || 
|-id=504 bgcolor=#fefefe
| 120504 ||  || — || September 22, 1993 || La Silla || H. Debehogne, E. W. Elst || — || align=right | 1.6 km || 
|-id=505 bgcolor=#fefefe
| 120505 ||  || — || September 22, 1993 || La Silla || H. Debehogne, E. W. Elst || — || align=right | 2.7 km || 
|-id=506 bgcolor=#fefefe
| 120506 ||  || — || October 15, 1993 || Kitami || K. Endate, K. Watanabe || PHO || align=right | 3.6 km || 
|-id=507 bgcolor=#fefefe
| 120507 ||  || — || October 9, 1993 || La Silla || E. W. Elst || EUT || align=right | 1.2 km || 
|-id=508 bgcolor=#d6d6d6
| 120508 ||  || — || October 9, 1993 || La Silla || E. W. Elst || — || align=right | 3.7 km || 
|-id=509 bgcolor=#fefefe
| 120509 ||  || — || October 9, 1993 || La Silla || E. W. Elst || — || align=right | 1.7 km || 
|-id=510 bgcolor=#d6d6d6
| 120510 ||  || — || October 9, 1993 || La Silla || E. W. Elst || THM || align=right | 4.1 km || 
|-id=511 bgcolor=#E9E9E9
| 120511 ||  || — || October 9, 1993 || La Silla || E. W. Elst || — || align=right | 2.1 km || 
|-id=512 bgcolor=#fefefe
| 120512 ||  || — || October 9, 1993 || La Silla || E. W. Elst || MAS || align=right | 1.2 km || 
|-id=513 bgcolor=#d6d6d6
| 120513 ||  || — || October 9, 1993 || La Silla || E. W. Elst || — || align=right | 5.5 km || 
|-id=514 bgcolor=#fefefe
| 120514 ||  || — || October 9, 1993 || La Silla || E. W. Elst || — || align=right | 1.7 km || 
|-id=515 bgcolor=#fefefe
| 120515 ||  || — || October 9, 1993 || La Silla || E. W. Elst || NYS || align=right | 1.1 km || 
|-id=516 bgcolor=#fefefe
| 120516 ||  || — || October 9, 1993 || La Silla || E. W. Elst || — || align=right | 3.2 km || 
|-id=517 bgcolor=#d6d6d6
| 120517 ||  || — || October 20, 1993 || La Silla || E. W. Elst || — || align=right | 4.0 km || 
|-id=518 bgcolor=#fefefe
| 120518 ||  || — || November 9, 1993 || Kitt Peak || Spacewatch || — || align=right | 1.7 km || 
|-id=519 bgcolor=#E9E9E9
| 120519 ||  || — || January 7, 1994 || Kitt Peak || Spacewatch || — || align=right | 2.1 km || 
|-id=520 bgcolor=#E9E9E9
| 120520 ||  || — || January 13, 1994 || Kitt Peak || Spacewatch || — || align=right | 1.5 km || 
|-id=521 bgcolor=#E9E9E9
| 120521 ||  || — || February 7, 1994 || La Silla || E. W. Elst || — || align=right | 1.6 km || 
|-id=522 bgcolor=#fefefe
| 120522 ||  || — || July 11, 1994 || La Silla || H. Debehogne, E. W. Elst || — || align=right | 1.1 km || 
|-id=523 bgcolor=#d6d6d6
| 120523 ||  || — || August 10, 1994 || La Silla || E. W. Elst || — || align=right | 4.5 km || 
|-id=524 bgcolor=#d6d6d6
| 120524 ||  || — || August 10, 1994 || La Silla || E. W. Elst || HYG || align=right | 4.0 km || 
|-id=525 bgcolor=#fefefe
| 120525 ||  || — || August 10, 1994 || La Silla || E. W. Elst || FLO || align=right | 1.1 km || 
|-id=526 bgcolor=#fefefe
| 120526 ||  || — || August 10, 1994 || La Silla || E. W. Elst || NYS || align=right data-sort-value="0.91" | 910 m || 
|-id=527 bgcolor=#fefefe
| 120527 ||  || — || August 10, 1994 || La Silla || E. W. Elst || FLO || align=right | 2.2 km || 
|-id=528 bgcolor=#E9E9E9
| 120528 ||  || — || August 10, 1994 || La Silla || E. W. Elst || AGN || align=right | 2.2 km || 
|-id=529 bgcolor=#fefefe
| 120529 ||  || — || August 12, 1994 || La Silla || E. W. Elst || NYS || align=right | 1.5 km || 
|-id=530 bgcolor=#fefefe
| 120530 ||  || — || August 12, 1994 || La Silla || E. W. Elst || NYS || align=right | 1.1 km || 
|-id=531 bgcolor=#fefefe
| 120531 ||  || — || August 12, 1994 || La Silla || E. W. Elst || — || align=right | 1.4 km || 
|-id=532 bgcolor=#fefefe
| 120532 ||  || — || August 10, 1994 || La Silla || E. W. Elst || — || align=right | 1.0 km || 
|-id=533 bgcolor=#fefefe
| 120533 ||  || — || August 10, 1994 || La Silla || E. W. Elst || — || align=right | 1.1 km || 
|-id=534 bgcolor=#fefefe
| 120534 ||  || — || September 12, 1994 || Kitt Peak || Spacewatch || NYS || align=right data-sort-value="0.90" | 900 m || 
|-id=535 bgcolor=#E9E9E9
| 120535 ||  || — || September 12, 1994 || Kitt Peak || Spacewatch || AGN || align=right | 1.8 km || 
|-id=536 bgcolor=#fefefe
| 120536 ||  || — || September 12, 1994 || Kitt Peak || Spacewatch || V || align=right | 1.2 km || 
|-id=537 bgcolor=#d6d6d6
| 120537 ||  || — || September 3, 1994 || La Silla || La Silla Obs. || KOR || align=right | 2.9 km || 
|-id=538 bgcolor=#d6d6d6
| 120538 ||  || — || September 28, 1994 || Kitt Peak || Spacewatch || — || align=right | 3.9 km || 
|-id=539 bgcolor=#E9E9E9
| 120539 ||  || — || September 28, 1994 || Kitt Peak || Spacewatch || AGN || align=right | 2.2 km || 
|-id=540 bgcolor=#d6d6d6
| 120540 ||  || — || September 30, 1994 || Xinglong || SCAP || EOS || align=right | 3.5 km || 
|-id=541 bgcolor=#fefefe
| 120541 ||  || — || October 2, 1994 || Kitt Peak || Spacewatch || — || align=right | 1.1 km || 
|-id=542 bgcolor=#fefefe
| 120542 ||  || — || October 8, 1994 || Kitt Peak || Spacewatch || NYS || align=right | 1.2 km || 
|-id=543 bgcolor=#fefefe
| 120543 ||  || — || October 28, 1994 || Kitt Peak || Spacewatch || — || align=right | 1.3 km || 
|-id=544 bgcolor=#fefefe
| 120544 || 1994 WK || — || November 25, 1994 || Oizumi || T. Kobayashi || H || align=right | 1.4 km || 
|-id=545 bgcolor=#fefefe
| 120545 || 1994 WS || — || November 25, 1994 || Oizumi || T. Kobayashi || — || align=right | 3.1 km || 
|-id=546 bgcolor=#d6d6d6
| 120546 ||  || — || November 28, 1994 || Kitt Peak || Spacewatch || TEL || align=right | 2.8 km || 
|-id=547 bgcolor=#fefefe
| 120547 ||  || — || December 31, 1994 || Kitt Peak || Spacewatch || NYS || align=right | 1.0 km || 
|-id=548 bgcolor=#fefefe
| 120548 || 1995 BO || — || January 23, 1995 || Oizumi || T. Kobayashi || CHL || align=right | 4.3 km || 
|-id=549 bgcolor=#fefefe
| 120549 ||  || — || January 29, 1995 || Kitt Peak || Spacewatch || MAS || align=right | 1.3 km || 
|-id=550 bgcolor=#fefefe
| 120550 ||  || — || January 29, 1995 || Kitt Peak || Spacewatch || — || align=right | 1.5 km || 
|-id=551 bgcolor=#d6d6d6
| 120551 ||  || — || January 29, 1995 || Kitt Peak || Spacewatch || — || align=right | 5.7 km || 
|-id=552 bgcolor=#d6d6d6
| 120552 ||  || — || February 1, 1995 || Kitt Peak || Spacewatch || — || align=right | 5.7 km || 
|-id=553 bgcolor=#d6d6d6
| 120553 ||  || — || February 1, 1995 || Kitt Peak || Spacewatch || — || align=right | 5.4 km || 
|-id=554 bgcolor=#d6d6d6
| 120554 ||  || — || February 1, 1995 || Kitt Peak || Spacewatch || — || align=right | 5.3 km || 
|-id=555 bgcolor=#fefefe
| 120555 ||  || — || February 4, 1995 || Kitt Peak || Spacewatch || H || align=right | 1.0 km || 
|-id=556 bgcolor=#fefefe
| 120556 ||  || — || February 4, 1995 || Kitt Peak || Spacewatch || NYS || align=right | 1.3 km || 
|-id=557 bgcolor=#fefefe
| 120557 ||  || — || February 21, 1995 || Kitt Peak || Spacewatch || — || align=right | 2.5 km || 
|-id=558 bgcolor=#d6d6d6
| 120558 ||  || — || February 21, 1995 || Kitt Peak || Spacewatch || — || align=right | 4.7 km || 
|-id=559 bgcolor=#fefefe
| 120559 ||  || — || March 1, 1995 || Kitt Peak || Spacewatch || NYS || align=right | 1.3 km || 
|-id=560 bgcolor=#fefefe
| 120560 ||  || — || March 2, 1995 || Kitt Peak || Spacewatch || NYS || align=right | 1.6 km || 
|-id=561 bgcolor=#d6d6d6
| 120561 ||  || — || March 2, 1995 || Kitt Peak || Spacewatch || — || align=right | 5.6 km || 
|-id=562 bgcolor=#fefefe
| 120562 ||  || — || March 23, 1995 || Kitt Peak || Spacewatch || MAS || align=right | 1.5 km || 
|-id=563 bgcolor=#fefefe
| 120563 ||  || — || March 23, 1995 || Kitt Peak || Spacewatch || — || align=right | 1.9 km || 
|-id=564 bgcolor=#fefefe
| 120564 ||  || — || March 23, 1995 || Kitt Peak || Spacewatch || NYS || align=right | 1.1 km || 
|-id=565 bgcolor=#E9E9E9
| 120565 ||  || — || March 23, 1995 || Kitt Peak || Spacewatch || — || align=right | 1.6 km || 
|-id=566 bgcolor=#fefefe
| 120566 ||  || — || March 23, 1995 || Kitt Peak || Spacewatch || MAS || align=right data-sort-value="0.98" | 980 m || 
|-id=567 bgcolor=#d6d6d6
| 120567 ||  || — || March 23, 1995 || Kitt Peak || Spacewatch || THM || align=right | 3.7 km || 
|-id=568 bgcolor=#fefefe
| 120568 ||  || — || March 27, 1995 || Kitt Peak || Spacewatch || — || align=right | 1.5 km || 
|-id=569 bgcolor=#d6d6d6
| 120569 Huangrunqian ||  ||  || March 24, 1995 || Xinglong || SCAP || LIX || align=right | 7.2 km || 
|-id=570 bgcolor=#d6d6d6
| 120570 ||  || — || April 2, 1995 || Kitt Peak || Spacewatch || HYG || align=right | 3.6 km || 
|-id=571 bgcolor=#fefefe
| 120571 ||  || — || April 24, 1995 || Kitt Peak || Spacewatch || — || align=right | 1.2 km || 
|-id=572 bgcolor=#E9E9E9
| 120572 ||  || — || June 29, 1995 || Kitt Peak || Spacewatch || — || align=right | 4.2 km || 
|-id=573 bgcolor=#fefefe
| 120573 ||  || — || June 25, 1995 || Kitt Peak || Spacewatch || V || align=right | 1.1 km || 
|-id=574 bgcolor=#fefefe
| 120574 ||  || — || July 19, 1995 || Xinglong || SCAP || — || align=right data-sort-value="0.89" | 890 m || 
|-id=575 bgcolor=#E9E9E9
| 120575 || 1995 QD || — || August 17, 1995 || Colleverde || V. S. Casulli || — || align=right | 3.5 km || 
|-id=576 bgcolor=#E9E9E9
| 120576 ||  || — || August 25, 1995 || Nachi-Katsuura || Y. Shimizu, T. Urata || — || align=right | 3.8 km || 
|-id=577 bgcolor=#E9E9E9
| 120577 ||  || — || August 22, 1995 || Kitt Peak || Spacewatch || — || align=right | 1.5 km || 
|-id=578 bgcolor=#E9E9E9
| 120578 ||  || — || August 22, 1995 || Kitt Peak || Spacewatch || — || align=right | 3.9 km || 
|-id=579 bgcolor=#E9E9E9
| 120579 ||  || — || August 28, 1995 || Kitt Peak || Spacewatch || — || align=right | 1.6 km || 
|-id=580 bgcolor=#fefefe
| 120580 || 1995 SF || — || September 17, 1995 || Kleť || Z. Moravec || — || align=right data-sort-value="0.97" | 970 m || 
|-id=581 bgcolor=#E9E9E9
| 120581 ||  || — || September 17, 1995 || Kitt Peak || Spacewatch || — || align=right | 2.0 km || 
|-id=582 bgcolor=#E9E9E9
| 120582 ||  || — || September 18, 1995 || Kitt Peak || Spacewatch || — || align=right | 2.7 km || 
|-id=583 bgcolor=#E9E9E9
| 120583 ||  || — || September 18, 1995 || Kitt Peak || Spacewatch || — || align=right | 3.4 km || 
|-id=584 bgcolor=#E9E9E9
| 120584 ||  || — || September 18, 1995 || Kitt Peak || Spacewatch || — || align=right | 1.8 km || 
|-id=585 bgcolor=#E9E9E9
| 120585 ||  || — || September 19, 1995 || Kitt Peak || Spacewatch || — || align=right | 3.6 km || 
|-id=586 bgcolor=#E9E9E9
| 120586 ||  || — || September 19, 1995 || Kitt Peak || Spacewatch || HEN || align=right | 1.8 km || 
|-id=587 bgcolor=#E9E9E9
| 120587 ||  || — || September 21, 1995 || Kitt Peak || Spacewatch || — || align=right | 5.6 km || 
|-id=588 bgcolor=#E9E9E9
| 120588 ||  || — || September 22, 1995 || Kitt Peak || Spacewatch || — || align=right | 2.9 km || 
|-id=589 bgcolor=#d6d6d6
| 120589 ||  || — || September 22, 1995 || Kitt Peak || Spacewatch || KAR || align=right | 1.5 km || 
|-id=590 bgcolor=#E9E9E9
| 120590 ||  || — || September 25, 1995 || Kitt Peak || Spacewatch || — || align=right | 3.5 km || 
|-id=591 bgcolor=#E9E9E9
| 120591 ||  || — || September 26, 1995 || Kitt Peak || Spacewatch || — || align=right | 4.0 km || 
|-id=592 bgcolor=#E9E9E9
| 120592 ||  || — || September 29, 1995 || Kitt Peak || Spacewatch || AGN || align=right | 1.8 km || 
|-id=593 bgcolor=#E9E9E9
| 120593 ||  || — || September 25, 1995 || Kitt Peak || Spacewatch || — || align=right | 2.1 km || 
|-id=594 bgcolor=#E9E9E9
| 120594 ||  || — || September 19, 1995 || Kitt Peak || Spacewatch || HEN || align=right | 1.6 km || 
|-id=595 bgcolor=#E9E9E9
| 120595 ||  || — || October 15, 1995 || Kitt Peak || Spacewatch || GEF || align=right | 1.8 km || 
|-id=596 bgcolor=#E9E9E9
| 120596 ||  || — || October 17, 1995 || Kitt Peak || Spacewatch || — || align=right | 2.8 km || 
|-id=597 bgcolor=#E9E9E9
| 120597 ||  || — || October 17, 1995 || Kitt Peak || Spacewatch || AGN || align=right | 1.9 km || 
|-id=598 bgcolor=#E9E9E9
| 120598 ||  || — || October 18, 1995 || Kitt Peak || Spacewatch || — || align=right | 3.2 km || 
|-id=599 bgcolor=#E9E9E9
| 120599 ||  || — || October 21, 1995 || Kitt Peak || Spacewatch || — || align=right | 3.4 km || 
|-id=600 bgcolor=#fefefe
| 120600 ||  || — || October 23, 1995 || Kitt Peak || Spacewatch || — || align=right | 1.1 km || 
|}

120601–120700 

|-bgcolor=#fefefe
| 120601 ||  || — || October 20, 1995 || Kitt Peak || Spacewatch || FLO || align=right data-sort-value="0.99" | 990 m || 
|-id=602 bgcolor=#E9E9E9
| 120602 ||  || — || November 11, 1995 || Xinglong || SCAP || NEM || align=right | 4.3 km || 
|-id=603 bgcolor=#E9E9E9
| 120603 ||  || — || November 14, 1995 || Kitt Peak || Spacewatch || — || align=right | 3.0 km || 
|-id=604 bgcolor=#fefefe
| 120604 ||  || — || November 14, 1995 || Kitt Peak || Spacewatch || — || align=right | 1.7 km || 
|-id=605 bgcolor=#E9E9E9
| 120605 ||  || — || November 14, 1995 || Kitt Peak || Spacewatch || AST || align=right | 3.7 km || 
|-id=606 bgcolor=#E9E9E9
| 120606 ||  || — || November 15, 1995 || Kitt Peak || Spacewatch || — || align=right | 3.0 km || 
|-id=607 bgcolor=#fefefe
| 120607 ||  || — || November 15, 1995 || Kitt Peak || Spacewatch || — || align=right | 1.4 km || 
|-id=608 bgcolor=#d6d6d6
| 120608 ||  || — || November 16, 1995 || Kitt Peak || Spacewatch || CHA || align=right | 3.5 km || 
|-id=609 bgcolor=#E9E9E9
| 120609 ||  || — || November 16, 1995 || Kitt Peak || Spacewatch || — || align=right | 2.8 km || 
|-id=610 bgcolor=#fefefe
| 120610 ||  || — || November 17, 1995 || Kitt Peak || Spacewatch || — || align=right data-sort-value="0.82" | 820 m || 
|-id=611 bgcolor=#E9E9E9
| 120611 ||  || — || November 17, 1995 || Kitt Peak || Spacewatch || — || align=right | 3.0 km || 
|-id=612 bgcolor=#fefefe
| 120612 ||  || — || November 17, 1995 || Kitt Peak || Spacewatch || — || align=right | 2.4 km || 
|-id=613 bgcolor=#E9E9E9
| 120613 ||  || — || November 17, 1995 || Kitt Peak || Spacewatch || — || align=right | 4.3 km || 
|-id=614 bgcolor=#fefefe
| 120614 ||  || — || November 18, 1995 || Kitt Peak || Spacewatch || V || align=right | 1.1 km || 
|-id=615 bgcolor=#E9E9E9
| 120615 ||  || — || November 19, 1995 || Kitt Peak || Spacewatch || — || align=right | 3.9 km || 
|-id=616 bgcolor=#E9E9E9
| 120616 ||  || — || November 20, 1995 || Kitt Peak || Spacewatch || — || align=right | 4.4 km || 
|-id=617 bgcolor=#E9E9E9
| 120617 ||  || — || December 14, 1995 || Kitt Peak || Spacewatch || — || align=right | 3.1 km || 
|-id=618 bgcolor=#d6d6d6
| 120618 ||  || — || December 16, 1995 || Kitt Peak || Spacewatch || SHU3:2 || align=right | 9.7 km || 
|-id=619 bgcolor=#fefefe
| 120619 ||  || — || December 18, 1995 || Kitt Peak || Spacewatch || FLO || align=right | 1.2 km || 
|-id=620 bgcolor=#d6d6d6
| 120620 ||  || — || December 25, 1995 || Kitt Peak || Spacewatch || — || align=right | 4.1 km || 
|-id=621 bgcolor=#d6d6d6
| 120621 ||  || — || January 15, 1996 || Kitt Peak || Spacewatch || — || align=right | 3.5 km || 
|-id=622 bgcolor=#fefefe
| 120622 ||  || — || January 15, 1996 || Kitt Peak || Spacewatch || V || align=right | 1.3 km || 
|-id=623 bgcolor=#fefefe
| 120623 ||  || — || January 18, 1996 || Kitt Peak || Spacewatch || NYS || align=right | 1.1 km || 
|-id=624 bgcolor=#d6d6d6
| 120624 ||  || — || March 11, 1996 || Haleakala || AMOS || — || align=right | 5.4 km || 
|-id=625 bgcolor=#fefefe
| 120625 ||  || — || March 11, 1996 || Kitt Peak || Spacewatch || FLO || align=right | 1.2 km || 
|-id=626 bgcolor=#d6d6d6
| 120626 ||  || — || March 11, 1996 || Kitt Peak || Spacewatch || — || align=right | 3.4 km || 
|-id=627 bgcolor=#d6d6d6
| 120627 ||  || — || March 12, 1996 || Kitt Peak || Spacewatch || THM || align=right | 3.4 km || 
|-id=628 bgcolor=#d6d6d6
| 120628 ||  || — || March 24, 1996 || La Silla || E. W. Elst || — || align=right | 4.2 km || 
|-id=629 bgcolor=#fefefe
| 120629 ||  || — || April 12, 1996 || Kitt Peak || Spacewatch || NYS || align=right | 1.2 km || 
|-id=630 bgcolor=#d6d6d6
| 120630 ||  || — || April 13, 1996 || Kitt Peak || Spacewatch || — || align=right | 6.0 km || 
|-id=631 bgcolor=#d6d6d6
| 120631 ||  || — || April 13, 1996 || Kitt Peak || Spacewatch || THM || align=right | 5.2 km || 
|-id=632 bgcolor=#d6d6d6
| 120632 ||  || — || April 13, 1996 || Kitt Peak || Spacewatch || — || align=right | 4.5 km || 
|-id=633 bgcolor=#fefefe
| 120633 ||  || — || April 15, 1996 || Kitt Peak || Spacewatch || — || align=right | 1.8 km || 
|-id=634 bgcolor=#fefefe
| 120634 ||  || — || April 12, 1996 || Kitt Peak || Spacewatch || MAS || align=right | 1.2 km || 
|-id=635 bgcolor=#d6d6d6
| 120635 ||  || — || April 18, 1996 || La Silla || E. W. Elst || — || align=right | 5.6 km || 
|-id=636 bgcolor=#d6d6d6
| 120636 ||  || — || April 18, 1996 || La Silla || E. W. Elst || — || align=right | 5.8 km || 
|-id=637 bgcolor=#fefefe
| 120637 ||  || — || May 9, 1996 || Kitt Peak || Spacewatch || — || align=right | 1.2 km || 
|-id=638 bgcolor=#fefefe
| 120638 ||  || — || May 11, 1996 || Kitt Peak || Spacewatch || FLO || align=right | 1.00 km || 
|-id=639 bgcolor=#d6d6d6
| 120639 ||  || — || May 24, 1996 || Xinglong || SCAP || — || align=right | 4.9 km || 
|-id=640 bgcolor=#fefefe
| 120640 || 1996 PN || — || August 9, 1996 || Macquarie || R. H. McNaught, J. B. Child || PHO || align=right | 5.1 km || 
|-id=641 bgcolor=#E9E9E9
| 120641 ||  || — || August 10, 1996 || Haleakala || NEAT || — || align=right | 1.9 km || 
|-id=642 bgcolor=#fefefe
| 120642 ||  || — || August 10, 1996 || Haleakala || NEAT || MAS || align=right | 1.4 km || 
|-id=643 bgcolor=#fefefe
| 120643 Rudimandl || 1996 RU ||  || September 10, 1996 || Kleť || M. Tichý || — || align=right | 1.5 km || 
|-id=644 bgcolor=#FA8072
| 120644 ||  || — || September 11, 1996 || Haleakala || NEAT || — || align=right | 3.9 km || 
|-id=645 bgcolor=#E9E9E9
| 120645 ||  || — || September 7, 1996 || Kitt Peak || Spacewatch || — || align=right | 1.2 km || 
|-id=646 bgcolor=#fefefe
| 120646 ||  || — || September 13, 1996 || Kitt Peak || Spacewatch || NYS || align=right | 1.3 km || 
|-id=647 bgcolor=#E9E9E9
| 120647 ||  || — || September 21, 1996 || Kitt Peak || Spacewatch || — || align=right | 2.8 km || 
|-id=648 bgcolor=#E9E9E9
| 120648 ||  || — || September 19, 1996 || Xinglong || SCAP || KRM || align=right | 5.3 km || 
|-id=649 bgcolor=#fefefe
| 120649 ||  || — || October 8, 1996 || Haleakala || NEAT || NYS || align=right | 1.4 km || 
|-id=650 bgcolor=#E9E9E9
| 120650 ||  || — || October 11, 1996 || Haleakala || NEAT || EUN || align=right | 2.7 km || 
|-id=651 bgcolor=#E9E9E9
| 120651 ||  || — || October 15, 1996 || Sudbury || D. di Cicco || — || align=right | 2.9 km || 
|-id=652 bgcolor=#fefefe
| 120652 ||  || — || October 4, 1996 || Kitt Peak || Spacewatch || — || align=right | 1.7 km || 
|-id=653 bgcolor=#E9E9E9
| 120653 ||  || — || October 4, 1996 || Kitt Peak || Spacewatch || — || align=right | 2.4 km || 
|-id=654 bgcolor=#fefefe
| 120654 ||  || — || October 7, 1996 || Kitt Peak || Spacewatch || — || align=right | 2.9 km || 
|-id=655 bgcolor=#E9E9E9
| 120655 ||  || — || October 7, 1996 || Kitt Peak || Spacewatch || — || align=right | 2.5 km || 
|-id=656 bgcolor=#E9E9E9
| 120656 ||  || — || October 7, 1996 || Kitt Peak || Spacewatch || — || align=right | 1.1 km || 
|-id=657 bgcolor=#E9E9E9
| 120657 ||  || — || October 17, 1996 || Kitt Peak || Spacewatch || — || align=right | 2.2 km || 
|-id=658 bgcolor=#fefefe
| 120658 ||  || — || October 17, 1996 || Kitt Peak || Spacewatch || — || align=right | 1.3 km || 
|-id=659 bgcolor=#E9E9E9
| 120659 ||  || — || October 18, 1996 || Kitt Peak || Spacewatch || — || align=right | 3.4 km || 
|-id=660 bgcolor=#E9E9E9
| 120660 || 1996 VA || — || November 1, 1996 || Prescott || P. G. Comba || — || align=right | 3.3 km || 
|-id=661 bgcolor=#E9E9E9
| 120661 ||  || — || November 11, 1996 || Sudbury || D. di Cicco || GEF || align=right | 2.3 km || 
|-id=662 bgcolor=#d6d6d6
| 120662 ||  || — || November 3, 1996 || Kitt Peak || Spacewatch || HIL3:2 || align=right | 9.3 km || 
|-id=663 bgcolor=#E9E9E9
| 120663 ||  || — || November 5, 1996 || Kitt Peak || Spacewatch || AST || align=right | 2.8 km || 
|-id=664 bgcolor=#E9E9E9
| 120664 ||  || — || November 5, 1996 || Kitt Peak || Spacewatch || — || align=right | 1.7 km || 
|-id=665 bgcolor=#E9E9E9
| 120665 || 1996 XT || — || December 1, 1996 || Chichibu || N. Satō || GEF || align=right | 2.4 km || 
|-id=666 bgcolor=#E9E9E9
| 120666 ||  || — || December 6, 1996 || Kitt Peak || Spacewatch || — || align=right | 4.3 km || 
|-id=667 bgcolor=#d6d6d6
| 120667 ||  || — || December 1, 1996 || Kitt Peak || Spacewatch || TEL || align=right | 2.4 km || 
|-id=668 bgcolor=#fefefe
| 120668 ||  || — || December 6, 1996 || Kitt Peak || Spacewatch || V || align=right | 1.1 km || 
|-id=669 bgcolor=#E9E9E9
| 120669 ||  || — || December 4, 1996 || Kitt Peak || Spacewatch || HEN || align=right | 1.7 km || 
|-id=670 bgcolor=#E9E9E9
| 120670 ||  || — || December 8, 1996 || Kitt Peak || Spacewatch || — || align=right | 1.9 km || 
|-id=671 bgcolor=#E9E9E9
| 120671 ||  || — || December 12, 1996 || Oohira || T. Urata || EUN || align=right | 3.3 km || 
|-id=672 bgcolor=#E9E9E9
| 120672 || 1997 AK || — || January 2, 1997 || Oizumi || T. Kobayashi || — || align=right | 1.4 km || 
|-id=673 bgcolor=#E9E9E9
| 120673 ||  || — || January 2, 1997 || Xinglong || SCAP || — || align=right | 3.2 km || 
|-id=674 bgcolor=#E9E9E9
| 120674 ||  || — || January 2, 1997 || Kitt Peak || Spacewatch || — || align=right | 3.1 km || 
|-id=675 bgcolor=#d6d6d6
| 120675 ||  || — || January 9, 1997 || Kitt Peak || Spacewatch || — || align=right | 3.6 km || 
|-id=676 bgcolor=#E9E9E9
| 120676 ||  || — || January 14, 1997 || Kleť || Kleť Obs. || — || align=right | 2.2 km || 
|-id=677 bgcolor=#fefefe
| 120677 ||  || — || January 11, 1997 || Kitt Peak || Spacewatch || — || align=right | 1.2 km || 
|-id=678 bgcolor=#E9E9E9
| 120678 ||  || — || January 31, 1997 || Kitt Peak || Spacewatch || — || align=right | 2.9 km || 
|-id=679 bgcolor=#E9E9E9
| 120679 ||  || — || January 29, 1997 || Sormano || A. Testa, P. Chiavenna || — || align=right | 3.9 km || 
|-id=680 bgcolor=#d6d6d6
| 120680 ||  || — || January 31, 1997 || Prescott || P. G. Comba || KOR || align=right | 2.6 km || 
|-id=681 bgcolor=#E9E9E9
| 120681 ||  || — || January 31, 1997 || Kitt Peak || Spacewatch || — || align=right | 4.3 km || 
|-id=682 bgcolor=#E9E9E9
| 120682 ||  || — || February 1, 1997 || Kitt Peak || Spacewatch || — || align=right | 5.3 km || 
|-id=683 bgcolor=#E9E9E9
| 120683 ||  || — || February 6, 1997 || Modra || A. Galád, A. Pravda || — || align=right | 3.8 km || 
|-id=684 bgcolor=#E9E9E9
| 120684 ||  || — || February 1, 1997 || Kitt Peak || Spacewatch || — || align=right | 3.0 km || 
|-id=685 bgcolor=#E9E9E9
| 120685 ||  || — || February 1, 1997 || Kitt Peak || Spacewatch || — || align=right | 3.7 km || 
|-id=686 bgcolor=#fefefe
| 120686 ||  || — || February 3, 1997 || Kitt Peak || Spacewatch || — || align=right | 1.2 km || 
|-id=687 bgcolor=#E9E9E9
| 120687 ||  || — || February 3, 1997 || Kitt Peak || Spacewatch || GEF || align=right | 1.8 km || 
|-id=688 bgcolor=#fefefe
| 120688 ||  || — || February 7, 1997 || Kitt Peak || Spacewatch || — || align=right | 1.4 km || 
|-id=689 bgcolor=#E9E9E9
| 120689 ||  || — || March 4, 1997 || Kitt Peak || Spacewatch || — || align=right | 4.2 km || 
|-id=690 bgcolor=#E9E9E9
| 120690 ||  || — || March 2, 1997 || Kitt Peak || Spacewatch || — || align=right | 4.0 km || 
|-id=691 bgcolor=#d6d6d6
| 120691 ||  || — || March 10, 1997 || Kitt Peak || Spacewatch || KOR || align=right | 2.1 km || 
|-id=692 bgcolor=#E9E9E9
| 120692 ||  || — || March 5, 1997 || Socorro || LINEAR || — || align=right | 4.6 km || 
|-id=693 bgcolor=#E9E9E9
| 120693 ||  || — || April 8, 1997 || Ondřejov || P. Pravec || — || align=right | 3.6 km || 
|-id=694 bgcolor=#E9E9E9
| 120694 ||  || — || April 2, 1997 || Socorro || LINEAR || — || align=right | 2.7 km || 
|-id=695 bgcolor=#fefefe
| 120695 ||  || — || April 7, 1997 || La Silla || E. W. Elst || — || align=right | 1.1 km || 
|-id=696 bgcolor=#d6d6d6
| 120696 || 1997 HH || — || April 28, 1997 || Kitt Peak || Spacewatch || THM || align=right | 3.5 km || 
|-id=697 bgcolor=#d6d6d6
| 120697 ||  || — || April 28, 1997 || Kitt Peak || Spacewatch || — || align=right | 3.9 km || 
|-id=698 bgcolor=#fefefe
| 120698 ||  || — || April 30, 1997 || Socorro || LINEAR || NYS || align=right | 1.3 km || 
|-id=699 bgcolor=#E9E9E9
| 120699 ||  || — || April 27, 1997 || Kitt Peak || Spacewatch || AGN || align=right | 2.1 km || 
|-id=700 bgcolor=#E9E9E9
| 120700 ||  || — || April 30, 1997 || Kitt Peak || Spacewatch || AGN || align=right | 2.1 km || 
|}

120701–120800 

|-bgcolor=#d6d6d6
| 120701 ||  || — || April 30, 1997 || Kitt Peak || Spacewatch || — || align=right | 3.2 km || 
|-id=702 bgcolor=#d6d6d6
| 120702 ||  || — || May 8, 1997 || Kitt Peak || Spacewatch || — || align=right | 5.7 km || 
|-id=703 bgcolor=#fefefe
| 120703 ||  || — || May 3, 1997 || La Silla || E. W. Elst || — || align=right | 1.2 km || 
|-id=704 bgcolor=#d6d6d6
| 120704 ||  || — || May 31, 1997 || Kitt Peak || Spacewatch || — || align=right | 4.9 km || 
|-id=705 bgcolor=#fefefe
| 120705 ||  || — || June 8, 1997 || La Silla || E. W. Elst || NYS || align=right | 1.4 km || 
|-id=706 bgcolor=#d6d6d6
| 120706 ||  || — || June 26, 1997 || Kitt Peak || Spacewatch || — || align=right | 6.2 km || 
|-id=707 bgcolor=#d6d6d6
| 120707 ||  || — || June 27, 1997 || Kitt Peak || Spacewatch || — || align=right | 5.7 km || 
|-id=708 bgcolor=#FA8072
| 120708 ||  || — || June 26, 1997 || Kitt Peak || Spacewatch || — || align=right | 1.4 km || 
|-id=709 bgcolor=#fefefe
| 120709 ||  || — || June 29, 1997 || Socorro || LINEAR || FLO || align=right | 1.4 km || 
|-id=710 bgcolor=#fefefe
| 120710 ||  || — || June 29, 1997 || Kitt Peak || Spacewatch || V || align=right | 1.0 km || 
|-id=711 bgcolor=#d6d6d6
| 120711 ||  || — || June 30, 1997 || Kitt Peak || Spacewatch || — || align=right | 4.7 km || 
|-id=712 bgcolor=#d6d6d6
| 120712 ||  || — || June 30, 1997 || Kitt Peak || Spacewatch || — || align=right | 4.4 km || 
|-id=713 bgcolor=#fefefe
| 120713 ||  || — || August 30, 1997 || Haleakala || NEAT || PHO || align=right | 4.2 km || 
|-id=714 bgcolor=#fefefe
| 120714 ||  || — || September 25, 1997 || Rand || G. R. Viscome || — || align=right | 1.6 km || 
|-id=715 bgcolor=#fefefe
| 120715 ||  || — || September 27, 1997 || Oizumi || T. Kobayashi || — || align=right | 2.3 km || 
|-id=716 bgcolor=#fefefe
| 120716 ||  || — || September 28, 1997 || Needville || Needville Obs. || MAS || align=right | 1.2 km || 
|-id=717 bgcolor=#fefefe
| 120717 ||  || — || September 23, 1997 || Kitt Peak || Spacewatch || FLO || align=right | 1.2 km || 
|-id=718 bgcolor=#fefefe
| 120718 ||  || — || September 23, 1997 || Kitt Peak || Spacewatch || V || align=right | 1.4 km || 
|-id=719 bgcolor=#d6d6d6
| 120719 ||  || — || September 27, 1997 || Kitt Peak || Spacewatch || HYG || align=right | 4.6 km || 
|-id=720 bgcolor=#fefefe
| 120720 ||  || — || September 27, 1997 || Kitt Peak || Spacewatch || — || align=right | 1.4 km || 
|-id=721 bgcolor=#E9E9E9
| 120721 ||  || — || September 28, 1997 || Kitt Peak || Spacewatch || — || align=right | 1.5 km || 
|-id=722 bgcolor=#d6d6d6
| 120722 ||  || — || September 28, 1997 || Kitt Peak || Spacewatch || — || align=right | 6.4 km || 
|-id=723 bgcolor=#E9E9E9
| 120723 ||  || — || September 27, 1997 || Caussols || ODAS || — || align=right | 2.2 km || 
|-id=724 bgcolor=#fefefe
| 120724 ||  || — || September 28, 1997 || Kitt Peak || Spacewatch || NYS || align=right data-sort-value="0.89" | 890 m || 
|-id=725 bgcolor=#fefefe
| 120725 ||  || — || September 28, 1997 || Kitt Peak || Spacewatch || — || align=right | 1.4 km || 
|-id=726 bgcolor=#fefefe
| 120726 ||  || — || September 25, 1997 || Uccle || T. Pauwels || NYS || align=right | 1.5 km || 
|-id=727 bgcolor=#d6d6d6
| 120727 ||  || — || September 27, 1997 || Bergisch Gladbach || W. Bickel || — || align=right | 6.0 km || 
|-id=728 bgcolor=#fefefe
| 120728 ||  || — || September 28, 1997 || Haleakala || AMOS || — || align=right | 1.7 km || 
|-id=729 bgcolor=#fefefe
| 120729 ||  || — || September 28, 1997 || Haleakala || AMOS || NYS || align=right | 1.2 km || 
|-id=730 bgcolor=#fefefe
| 120730 Zhouyouyuan ||  ||  || September 26, 1997 || Xinglong || SCAP || NYS || align=right | 1.0 km || 
|-id=731 bgcolor=#fefefe
| 120731 ||  || — || October 3, 1997 || Caussols || ODAS || NYS || align=right | 1.4 km || 
|-id=732 bgcolor=#E9E9E9
| 120732 ||  || — || October 3, 1997 || Caussols || ODAS || — || align=right | 1.8 km || 
|-id=733 bgcolor=#fefefe
| 120733 ||  || — || October 2, 1997 || Caussols || ODAS || MAS || align=right | 1.9 km || 
|-id=734 bgcolor=#fefefe
| 120734 ||  || — || October 2, 1997 || Kitt Peak || Spacewatch || — || align=right | 1.4 km || 
|-id=735 bgcolor=#fefefe
| 120735 Ogawakiyoshi ||  ||  || October 7, 1997 || Yatsuka || H. Abe || MAS || align=right | 2.0 km || 
|-id=736 bgcolor=#E9E9E9
| 120736 ||  || — || October 9, 1997 || Ondřejov || L. Kotková || — || align=right | 2.4 km || 
|-id=737 bgcolor=#E9E9E9
| 120737 ||  || — || October 8, 1997 || Oizumi || T. Kobayashi || — || align=right | 1.9 km || 
|-id=738 bgcolor=#fefefe
| 120738 ||  || — || October 2, 1997 || Haleakala || AMOS || — || align=right | 1.4 km || 
|-id=739 bgcolor=#fefefe
| 120739 ||  || — || October 11, 1997 || Xinglong || SCAP || — || align=right | 2.6 km || 
|-id=740 bgcolor=#E9E9E9
| 120740 ||  || — || October 23, 1997 || Kitt Peak || Spacewatch || — || align=right | 1.4 km || 
|-id=741 bgcolor=#E9E9E9
| 120741 Iijimayuichi ||  ||  || October 26, 1997 || Chichibu || N. Satō || — || align=right | 2.3 km || 
|-id=742 bgcolor=#fefefe
| 120742 ||  || — || November 4, 1997 || Ondřejov || L. Kotková || NYS || align=right data-sort-value="0.81" | 810 m || 
|-id=743 bgcolor=#E9E9E9
| 120743 ||  || — || November 8, 1997 || Oizumi || T. Kobayashi || RAF || align=right | 1.7 km || 
|-id=744 bgcolor=#E9E9E9
| 120744 ||  || — || November 21, 1997 || Kitt Peak || Spacewatch || — || align=right | 1.1 km || 
|-id=745 bgcolor=#E9E9E9
| 120745 ||  || — || November 21, 1997 || Kitt Peak || Spacewatch || — || align=right | 1.5 km || 
|-id=746 bgcolor=#fefefe
| 120746 ||  || — || November 21, 1997 || Kitt Peak || Spacewatch || NYS || align=right | 1.3 km || 
|-id=747 bgcolor=#fefefe
| 120747 ||  || — || November 22, 1997 || Kitt Peak || Spacewatch || MAS || align=right | 1.1 km || 
|-id=748 bgcolor=#fefefe
| 120748 ||  || — || November 22, 1997 || Kitt Peak || Spacewatch || NYS || align=right | 1.1 km || 
|-id=749 bgcolor=#fefefe
| 120749 ||  || — || November 23, 1997 || Kitt Peak || Spacewatch || — || align=right | 1.6 km || 
|-id=750 bgcolor=#E9E9E9
| 120750 ||  || — || November 24, 1997 || Kitt Peak || Spacewatch || MAR || align=right | 2.0 km || 
|-id=751 bgcolor=#fefefe
| 120751 ||  || — || November 30, 1997 || Oizumi || T. Kobayashi || NYS || align=right | 1.9 km || 
|-id=752 bgcolor=#fefefe
| 120752 ||  || — || November 28, 1997 || Kitt Peak || Spacewatch || — || align=right | 1.4 km || 
|-id=753 bgcolor=#fefefe
| 120753 ||  || — || November 29, 1997 || Kitt Peak || Spacewatch || — || align=right | 1.2 km || 
|-id=754 bgcolor=#fefefe
| 120754 ||  || — || November 29, 1997 || Socorro || LINEAR || — || align=right | 1.6 km || 
|-id=755 bgcolor=#fefefe
| 120755 ||  || — || November 29, 1997 || Socorro || LINEAR || EUT || align=right | 1.5 km || 
|-id=756 bgcolor=#fefefe
| 120756 ||  || — || December 5, 1997 || Caussols || ODAS || — || align=right | 1.3 km || 
|-id=757 bgcolor=#fefefe
| 120757 ||  || — || December 21, 1997 || Kitt Peak || Spacewatch || NYS || align=right | 1.3 km || 
|-id=758 bgcolor=#E9E9E9
| 120758 ||  || — || December 29, 1997 || Kitt Peak || Spacewatch || — || align=right | 2.1 km || 
|-id=759 bgcolor=#E9E9E9
| 120759 ||  || — || December 31, 1997 || Kitt Peak || Spacewatch || — || align=right | 2.6 km || 
|-id=760 bgcolor=#E9E9E9
| 120760 ||  || — || December 29, 1997 || Kitt Peak || Spacewatch || — || align=right | 2.2 km || 
|-id=761 bgcolor=#d6d6d6
| 120761 ||  || — || January 1, 1998 || Kitt Peak || Spacewatch || SHU3:2 || align=right | 8.6 km || 
|-id=762 bgcolor=#E9E9E9
| 120762 ||  || — || January 6, 1998 || Kitt Peak || Spacewatch || — || align=right | 3.2 km || 
|-id=763 bgcolor=#E9E9E9
| 120763 ||  || — || January 22, 1998 || Kitt Peak || Spacewatch || — || align=right | 3.9 km || 
|-id=764 bgcolor=#E9E9E9
| 120764 ||  || — || January 18, 1998 || Xinglong || SCAP || — || align=right | 4.3 km || 
|-id=765 bgcolor=#E9E9E9
| 120765 ||  || — || January 23, 1998 || Socorro || LINEAR || MIS || align=right | 4.4 km || 
|-id=766 bgcolor=#E9E9E9
| 120766 ||  || — || January 26, 1998 || Haleakala || NEAT || BRU || align=right | 6.2 km || 
|-id=767 bgcolor=#E9E9E9
| 120767 ||  || — || January 27, 1998 || Modra || P. Kolény, L. Kornoš || — || align=right | 2.3 km || 
|-id=768 bgcolor=#fefefe
| 120768 ||  || — || January 25, 1998 || Kitt Peak || Spacewatch || MAS || align=right | 1.7 km || 
|-id=769 bgcolor=#fefefe
| 120769 ||  || — || February 6, 1998 || Xinglong || SCAP || H || align=right | 1.3 km || 
|-id=770 bgcolor=#fefefe
| 120770 ||  || — || February 17, 1998 || Kitt Peak || Spacewatch || V || align=right | 1.5 km || 
|-id=771 bgcolor=#E9E9E9
| 120771 ||  || — || February 21, 1998 || Xinglong || SCAP || — || align=right | 5.4 km || 
|-id=772 bgcolor=#E9E9E9
| 120772 ||  || — || February 22, 1998 || Haleakala || NEAT || — || align=right | 3.2 km || 
|-id=773 bgcolor=#E9E9E9
| 120773 ||  || — || February 24, 1998 || Kitt Peak || Spacewatch || — || align=right | 2.1 km || 
|-id=774 bgcolor=#fefefe
| 120774 ||  || — || February 24, 1998 || Xinglong || SCAP || — || align=right | 2.8 km || 
|-id=775 bgcolor=#E9E9E9
| 120775 ||  || — || February 24, 1998 || Kitt Peak || Spacewatch || MAR || align=right | 2.9 km || 
|-id=776 bgcolor=#fefefe
| 120776 ||  || — || February 28, 1998 || Caussols || ODAS || H || align=right | 1.4 km || 
|-id=777 bgcolor=#E9E9E9
| 120777 ||  || — || February 23, 1998 || Kitt Peak || Spacewatch || — || align=right | 2.2 km || 
|-id=778 bgcolor=#E9E9E9
| 120778 ||  || — || February 27, 1998 || La Silla || E. W. Elst || — || align=right | 3.2 km || 
|-id=779 bgcolor=#E9E9E9
| 120779 ||  || — || March 5, 1998 || Xinglong || SCAP || — || align=right | 4.4 km || 
|-id=780 bgcolor=#E9E9E9
| 120780 ||  || — || March 1, 1998 || La Silla || E. W. Elst || — || align=right | 2.7 km || 
|-id=781 bgcolor=#E9E9E9
| 120781 ||  || — || March 1, 1998 || La Silla || E. W. Elst || — || align=right | 3.0 km || 
|-id=782 bgcolor=#E9E9E9
| 120782 ||  || — || March 1, 1998 || La Silla || E. W. Elst || HNS || align=right | 3.0 km || 
|-id=783 bgcolor=#E9E9E9
| 120783 ||  || — || March 3, 1998 || La Silla || E. W. Elst || — || align=right | 1.8 km || 
|-id=784 bgcolor=#E9E9E9
| 120784 ||  || — || March 3, 1998 || La Silla || E. W. Elst || — || align=right | 2.9 km || 
|-id=785 bgcolor=#E9E9E9
| 120785 ||  || — || March 20, 1998 || Kitt Peak || Spacewatch || — || align=right | 1.5 km || 
|-id=786 bgcolor=#E9E9E9
| 120786 ||  || — || March 20, 1998 || Kitt Peak || Spacewatch || — || align=right | 1.6 km || 
|-id=787 bgcolor=#E9E9E9
| 120787 ||  || — || March 20, 1998 || Xinglong || SCAP || — || align=right | 3.2 km || 
|-id=788 bgcolor=#E9E9E9
| 120788 ||  || — || March 26, 1998 || Kleť || Kleť Obs. || ADE || align=right | 4.9 km || 
|-id=789 bgcolor=#E9E9E9
| 120789 ||  || — || March 20, 1998 || Socorro || LINEAR || — || align=right | 3.1 km || 
|-id=790 bgcolor=#E9E9E9
| 120790 ||  || — || March 20, 1998 || Socorro || LINEAR || — || align=right | 2.0 km || 
|-id=791 bgcolor=#E9E9E9
| 120791 ||  || — || March 20, 1998 || Socorro || LINEAR || — || align=right | 1.8 km || 
|-id=792 bgcolor=#E9E9E9
| 120792 ||  || — || March 20, 1998 || Socorro || LINEAR || — || align=right | 2.0 km || 
|-id=793 bgcolor=#E9E9E9
| 120793 ||  || — || March 20, 1998 || Socorro || LINEAR || — || align=right | 3.3 km || 
|-id=794 bgcolor=#E9E9E9
| 120794 ||  || — || March 20, 1998 || Socorro || LINEAR || — || align=right | 1.8 km || 
|-id=795 bgcolor=#E9E9E9
| 120795 ||  || — || March 20, 1998 || Socorro || LINEAR || — || align=right | 1.6 km || 
|-id=796 bgcolor=#E9E9E9
| 120796 ||  || — || March 20, 1998 || Socorro || LINEAR || — || align=right | 3.7 km || 
|-id=797 bgcolor=#E9E9E9
| 120797 ||  || — || March 20, 1998 || Socorro || LINEAR || — || align=right | 1.9 km || 
|-id=798 bgcolor=#fefefe
| 120798 ||  || — || March 20, 1998 || Socorro || LINEAR || V || align=right | 1.5 km || 
|-id=799 bgcolor=#E9E9E9
| 120799 ||  || — || March 20, 1998 || Socorro || LINEAR || — || align=right | 2.1 km || 
|-id=800 bgcolor=#E9E9E9
| 120800 ||  || — || March 20, 1998 || Socorro || LINEAR || — || align=right | 1.6 km || 
|}

120801–120900 

|-bgcolor=#E9E9E9
| 120801 ||  || — || March 30, 1998 || Kleť || Kleť Obs. || — || align=right | 3.4 km || 
|-id=802 bgcolor=#E9E9E9
| 120802 ||  || — || March 24, 1998 || Socorro || LINEAR || — || align=right | 2.6 km || 
|-id=803 bgcolor=#E9E9E9
| 120803 ||  || — || March 31, 1998 || Socorro || LINEAR || — || align=right | 2.4 km || 
|-id=804 bgcolor=#E9E9E9
| 120804 ||  || — || March 24, 1998 || Socorro || LINEAR || — || align=right | 1.5 km || 
|-id=805 bgcolor=#E9E9E9
| 120805 ||  || — || March 28, 1998 || Socorro || LINEAR || — || align=right | 3.5 km || 
|-id=806 bgcolor=#E9E9E9
| 120806 ||  || — || April 2, 1998 || Socorro || LINEAR || EUN || align=right | 2.1 km || 
|-id=807 bgcolor=#fefefe
| 120807 || 1998 HK || — || April 18, 1998 || Socorro || LINEAR || H || align=right | 1.3 km || 
|-id=808 bgcolor=#fefefe
| 120808 ||  || — || April 23, 1998 || Socorro || LINEAR || H || align=right | 1.3 km || 
|-id=809 bgcolor=#E9E9E9
| 120809 ||  || — || April 21, 1998 || Višnjan Observatory || Višnjan Obs. || — || align=right | 1.8 km || 
|-id=810 bgcolor=#E9E9E9
| 120810 ||  || — || April 19, 1998 || Kitt Peak || Spacewatch || — || align=right | 2.6 km || 
|-id=811 bgcolor=#E9E9E9
| 120811 ||  || — || April 18, 1998 || Socorro || LINEAR || — || align=right | 1.7 km || 
|-id=812 bgcolor=#E9E9E9
| 120812 ||  || — || April 17, 1998 || Kitt Peak || Spacewatch || — || align=right | 4.9 km || 
|-id=813 bgcolor=#E9E9E9
| 120813 ||  || — || April 27, 1998 || Kitt Peak || Spacewatch || — || align=right | 3.4 km || 
|-id=814 bgcolor=#E9E9E9
| 120814 ||  || — || April 20, 1998 || Socorro || LINEAR || — || align=right | 1.5 km || 
|-id=815 bgcolor=#E9E9E9
| 120815 ||  || — || April 24, 1998 || Kitt Peak || Spacewatch || — || align=right | 1.8 km || 
|-id=816 bgcolor=#E9E9E9
| 120816 ||  || — || April 30, 1998 || Kleť || Kleť Obs. || EUN || align=right | 2.7 km || 
|-id=817 bgcolor=#E9E9E9
| 120817 ||  || — || April 21, 1998 || Socorro || LINEAR || — || align=right | 2.5 km || 
|-id=818 bgcolor=#E9E9E9
| 120818 ||  || — || April 21, 1998 || Socorro || LINEAR || — || align=right | 2.5 km || 
|-id=819 bgcolor=#E9E9E9
| 120819 ||  || — || April 21, 1998 || Socorro || LINEAR || — || align=right | 2.6 km || 
|-id=820 bgcolor=#E9E9E9
| 120820 ||  || — || April 21, 1998 || Socorro || LINEAR || — || align=right | 5.1 km || 
|-id=821 bgcolor=#E9E9E9
| 120821 ||  || — || April 21, 1998 || Socorro || LINEAR || JUN || align=right | 2.4 km || 
|-id=822 bgcolor=#E9E9E9
| 120822 ||  || — || April 21, 1998 || Socorro || LINEAR || — || align=right | 4.0 km || 
|-id=823 bgcolor=#E9E9E9
| 120823 ||  || — || April 23, 1998 || Socorro || LINEAR || — || align=right | 4.7 km || 
|-id=824 bgcolor=#E9E9E9
| 120824 ||  || — || April 23, 1998 || Socorro || LINEAR || — || align=right | 3.2 km || 
|-id=825 bgcolor=#E9E9E9
| 120825 ||  || — || April 23, 1998 || Socorro || LINEAR || — || align=right | 1.8 km || 
|-id=826 bgcolor=#E9E9E9
| 120826 ||  || — || April 23, 1998 || Socorro || LINEAR || — || align=right | 2.6 km || 
|-id=827 bgcolor=#E9E9E9
| 120827 ||  || — || April 23, 1998 || Socorro || LINEAR || — || align=right | 4.5 km || 
|-id=828 bgcolor=#E9E9E9
| 120828 ||  || — || April 23, 1998 || Socorro || LINEAR || JUN || align=right | 3.6 km || 
|-id=829 bgcolor=#E9E9E9
| 120829 ||  || — || April 23, 1998 || Socorro || LINEAR || — || align=right | 3.5 km || 
|-id=830 bgcolor=#E9E9E9
| 120830 ||  || — || April 19, 1998 || Socorro || LINEAR || — || align=right | 4.1 km || 
|-id=831 bgcolor=#E9E9E9
| 120831 ||  || — || April 19, 1998 || Socorro || LINEAR || — || align=right | 3.8 km || 
|-id=832 bgcolor=#E9E9E9
| 120832 ||  || — || April 19, 1998 || Socorro || LINEAR || — || align=right | 1.7 km || 
|-id=833 bgcolor=#E9E9E9
| 120833 ||  || — || April 21, 1998 || Socorro || LINEAR || MRX || align=right | 2.1 km || 
|-id=834 bgcolor=#E9E9E9
| 120834 ||  || — || April 21, 1998 || Socorro || LINEAR || — || align=right | 1.5 km || 
|-id=835 bgcolor=#E9E9E9
| 120835 ||  || — || April 24, 1998 || Socorro || LINEAR || GEF || align=right | 2.8 km || 
|-id=836 bgcolor=#E9E9E9
| 120836 ||  || — || May 23, 1998 || Anderson Mesa || LONEOS || — || align=right | 1.8 km || 
|-id=837 bgcolor=#E9E9E9
| 120837 ||  || — || May 27, 1998 || Anderson Mesa || LONEOS || EUN || align=right | 2.5 km || 
|-id=838 bgcolor=#E9E9E9
| 120838 ||  || — || May 22, 1998 || Socorro || LINEAR || — || align=right | 2.7 km || 
|-id=839 bgcolor=#E9E9E9
| 120839 ||  || — || May 22, 1998 || Socorro || LINEAR || JUN || align=right | 2.7 km || 
|-id=840 bgcolor=#E9E9E9
| 120840 ||  || — || May 28, 1998 || Kitt Peak || Spacewatch || — || align=right | 2.9 km || 
|-id=841 bgcolor=#E9E9E9
| 120841 ||  || — || May 23, 1998 || Socorro || LINEAR || JUN || align=right | 2.9 km || 
|-id=842 bgcolor=#E9E9E9
| 120842 ||  || — || May 23, 1998 || Socorro || LINEAR || — || align=right | 1.7 km || 
|-id=843 bgcolor=#E9E9E9
| 120843 ||  || — || May 22, 1998 || Socorro || LINEAR || — || align=right | 2.2 km || 
|-id=844 bgcolor=#E9E9E9
| 120844 ||  || — || May 23, 1998 || Socorro || LINEAR || — || align=right | 3.2 km || 
|-id=845 bgcolor=#E9E9E9
| 120845 ||  || — || May 22, 1998 || Socorro || LINEAR || — || align=right | 3.2 km || 
|-id=846 bgcolor=#E9E9E9
| 120846 ||  || — || May 23, 1998 || Socorro || LINEAR || — || align=right | 2.6 km || 
|-id=847 bgcolor=#d6d6d6
| 120847 || 1998 MG || — || June 17, 1998 || Kitt Peak || Spacewatch || — || align=right | 6.0 km || 
|-id=848 bgcolor=#fefefe
| 120848 ||  || — || June 24, 1998 || Socorro || LINEAR || — || align=right | 1.4 km || 
|-id=849 bgcolor=#E9E9E9
| 120849 ||  || — || July 23, 1998 || Caussols || ODAS || HOF || align=right | 4.2 km || 
|-id=850 bgcolor=#d6d6d6
| 120850 ||  || — || July 26, 1998 || La Silla || E. W. Elst || — || align=right | 6.3 km || 
|-id=851 bgcolor=#E9E9E9
| 120851 ||  || — || July 29, 1998 || Reedy Creek || J. Broughton || — || align=right | 4.4 km || 
|-id=852 bgcolor=#E9E9E9
| 120852 ||  || — || July 20, 1998 || Haleakala || NEAT || — || align=right | 3.5 km || 
|-id=853 bgcolor=#fefefe
| 120853 ||  || — || August 17, 1998 || Woomera || F. B. Zoltowski || — || align=right | 1.3 km || 
|-id=854 bgcolor=#fefefe
| 120854 ||  || — || August 17, 1998 || Socorro || LINEAR || — || align=right | 1.8 km || 
|-id=855 bgcolor=#d6d6d6
| 120855 ||  || — || August 17, 1998 || Socorro || LINEAR || — || align=right | 5.3 km || 
|-id=856 bgcolor=#d6d6d6
| 120856 ||  || — || August 17, 1998 || Socorro || LINEAR || NAE || align=right | 6.0 km || 
|-id=857 bgcolor=#d6d6d6
| 120857 ||  || — || August 17, 1998 || Socorro || LINEAR || — || align=right | 4.2 km || 
|-id=858 bgcolor=#fefefe
| 120858 ||  || — || August 17, 1998 || Socorro || LINEAR || — || align=right | 1.2 km || 
|-id=859 bgcolor=#d6d6d6
| 120859 ||  || — || August 17, 1998 || Socorro || LINEAR || — || align=right | 3.3 km || 
|-id=860 bgcolor=#d6d6d6
| 120860 ||  || — || August 26, 1998 || Kitt Peak || Spacewatch || — || align=right | 3.3 km || 
|-id=861 bgcolor=#d6d6d6
| 120861 ||  || — || August 24, 1998 || Socorro || LINEAR || — || align=right | 6.0 km || 
|-id=862 bgcolor=#d6d6d6
| 120862 ||  || — || August 24, 1998 || Socorro || LINEAR || EOS || align=right | 3.6 km || 
|-id=863 bgcolor=#d6d6d6
| 120863 ||  || — || August 17, 1998 || Socorro || LINEAR || EUP || align=right | 9.0 km || 
|-id=864 bgcolor=#E9E9E9
| 120864 ||  || — || August 26, 1998 || La Silla || E. W. Elst || — || align=right | 1.6 km || 
|-id=865 bgcolor=#fefefe
| 120865 ||  || — || August 25, 1998 || La Silla || E. W. Elst || FLO || align=right | 1.5 km || 
|-id=866 bgcolor=#fefefe
| 120866 ||  || — || September 15, 1998 || Caussols || ODAS || — || align=right | 1.7 km || 
|-id=867 bgcolor=#fefefe
| 120867 ||  || — || September 15, 1998 || Caussols || ODAS || — || align=right | 3.1 km || 
|-id=868 bgcolor=#fefefe
| 120868 ||  || — || September 14, 1998 || Kitt Peak || Spacewatch || — || align=right | 1.0 km || 
|-id=869 bgcolor=#fefefe
| 120869 ||  || — || September 14, 1998 || Xinglong || SCAP || — || align=right | 1.6 km || 
|-id=870 bgcolor=#fefefe
| 120870 ||  || — || September 11, 1998 || Caussols || ODAS || — || align=right | 1.2 km || 
|-id=871 bgcolor=#fefefe
| 120871 ||  || — || September 14, 1998 || Socorro || LINEAR || — || align=right | 1.3 km || 
|-id=872 bgcolor=#fefefe
| 120872 ||  || — || September 14, 1998 || Socorro || LINEAR || — || align=right | 1.3 km || 
|-id=873 bgcolor=#fefefe
| 120873 ||  || — || September 14, 1998 || Socorro || LINEAR || — || align=right | 1.5 km || 
|-id=874 bgcolor=#d6d6d6
| 120874 ||  || — || September 14, 1998 || Socorro || LINEAR || EOS || align=right | 3.8 km || 
|-id=875 bgcolor=#fefefe
| 120875 ||  || — || September 14, 1998 || Socorro || LINEAR || — || align=right | 1.3 km || 
|-id=876 bgcolor=#d6d6d6
| 120876 ||  || — || September 14, 1998 || Socorro || LINEAR || — || align=right | 8.1 km || 
|-id=877 bgcolor=#fefefe
| 120877 ||  || — || September 14, 1998 || Socorro || LINEAR || — || align=right | 1.5 km || 
|-id=878 bgcolor=#d6d6d6
| 120878 ||  || — || September 14, 1998 || Socorro || LINEAR || HYG || align=right | 5.4 km || 
|-id=879 bgcolor=#d6d6d6
| 120879 ||  || — || September 14, 1998 || Socorro || LINEAR || BRA || align=right | 2.8 km || 
|-id=880 bgcolor=#fefefe
| 120880 ||  || — || September 14, 1998 || Socorro || LINEAR || FLO || align=right | 1.2 km || 
|-id=881 bgcolor=#E9E9E9
| 120881 ||  || — || September 14, 1998 || Socorro || LINEAR || GEF || align=right | 3.0 km || 
|-id=882 bgcolor=#d6d6d6
| 120882 ||  || — || September 14, 1998 || Socorro || LINEAR || — || align=right | 5.3 km || 
|-id=883 bgcolor=#d6d6d6
| 120883 ||  || — || September 14, 1998 || Socorro || LINEAR || — || align=right | 3.4 km || 
|-id=884 bgcolor=#d6d6d6
| 120884 ||  || — || September 14, 1998 || Socorro || LINEAR || EOS || align=right | 4.2 km || 
|-id=885 bgcolor=#d6d6d6
| 120885 ||  || — || September 14, 1998 || Socorro || LINEAR || — || align=right | 6.1 km || 
|-id=886 bgcolor=#fefefe
| 120886 ||  || — || September 14, 1998 || Socorro || LINEAR || — || align=right | 1.4 km || 
|-id=887 bgcolor=#fefefe
| 120887 ||  || — || September 14, 1998 || Socorro || LINEAR || FLO || align=right | 1.2 km || 
|-id=888 bgcolor=#fefefe
| 120888 ||  || — || September 14, 1998 || Socorro || LINEAR || V || align=right | 1.4 km || 
|-id=889 bgcolor=#fefefe
| 120889 ||  || — || September 14, 1998 || Socorro || LINEAR || — || align=right | 1.5 km || 
|-id=890 bgcolor=#d6d6d6
| 120890 || 1998 SU || — || September 16, 1998 || Caussols || ODAS || KOR || align=right | 3.0 km || 
|-id=891 bgcolor=#fefefe
| 120891 ||  || — || September 16, 1998 || Caussols || ODAS || FLO || align=right data-sort-value="0.98" | 980 m || 
|-id=892 bgcolor=#d6d6d6
| 120892 ||  || — || September 17, 1998 || Caussols || ODAS || HYG || align=right | 4.8 km || 
|-id=893 bgcolor=#fefefe
| 120893 ||  || — || September 20, 1998 || Kitt Peak || Spacewatch || FLO || align=right | 1.0 km || 
|-id=894 bgcolor=#fefefe
| 120894 ||  || — || September 21, 1998 || Caussols || ODAS || FLO || align=right | 1.1 km || 
|-id=895 bgcolor=#fefefe
| 120895 ||  || — || September 18, 1998 || Anderson Mesa || LONEOS || — || align=right | 1.5 km || 
|-id=896 bgcolor=#d6d6d6
| 120896 ||  || — || September 20, 1998 || Kitt Peak || Spacewatch || — || align=right | 4.8 km || 
|-id=897 bgcolor=#d6d6d6
| 120897 ||  || — || September 21, 1998 || Kitt Peak || Spacewatch || — || align=right | 5.1 km || 
|-id=898 bgcolor=#d6d6d6
| 120898 ||  || — || September 21, 1998 || Kitt Peak || Spacewatch || — || align=right | 5.1 km || 
|-id=899 bgcolor=#fefefe
| 120899 ||  || — || September 21, 1998 || Kitt Peak || Spacewatch || — || align=right | 1.2 km || 
|-id=900 bgcolor=#FA8072
| 120900 ||  || — || September 22, 1998 || Anderson Mesa || LONEOS || — || align=right | 1.4 km || 
|}

120901–121000 

|-bgcolor=#fefefe
| 120901 ||  || — || September 22, 1998 || Anderson Mesa || LONEOS || FLO || align=right | 1.3 km || 
|-id=902 bgcolor=#fefefe
| 120902 ||  || — || September 17, 1998 || Kitt Peak || Spacewatch || — || align=right | 1.3 km || 
|-id=903 bgcolor=#d6d6d6
| 120903 ||  || — || September 20, 1998 || Kitt Peak || Spacewatch || — || align=right | 4.1 km || 
|-id=904 bgcolor=#d6d6d6
| 120904 ||  || — || September 20, 1998 || Kitt Peak || Spacewatch || — || align=right | 4.0 km || 
|-id=905 bgcolor=#d6d6d6
| 120905 ||  || — || September 23, 1998 || Kitt Peak || Spacewatch || — || align=right | 3.3 km || 
|-id=906 bgcolor=#d6d6d6
| 120906 ||  || — || September 23, 1998 || Kitt Peak || Spacewatch || THM || align=right | 3.6 km || 
|-id=907 bgcolor=#d6d6d6
| 120907 ||  || — || September 25, 1998 || Kitt Peak || Spacewatch || 7:4* || align=right | 6.2 km || 
|-id=908 bgcolor=#d6d6d6
| 120908 ||  || — || September 25, 1998 || Kitt Peak || Spacewatch || THM || align=right | 3.9 km || 
|-id=909 bgcolor=#E9E9E9
| 120909 ||  || — || September 17, 1998 || Anderson Mesa || LONEOS || — || align=right | 4.3 km || 
|-id=910 bgcolor=#fefefe
| 120910 ||  || — || September 17, 1998 || Anderson Mesa || LONEOS || — || align=right | 1.5 km || 
|-id=911 bgcolor=#fefefe
| 120911 ||  || — || September 20, 1998 || La Silla || E. W. Elst || — || align=right | 1.6 km || 
|-id=912 bgcolor=#E9E9E9
| 120912 ||  || — || September 21, 1998 || La Silla || E. W. Elst || — || align=right | 5.0 km || 
|-id=913 bgcolor=#fefefe
| 120913 ||  || — || September 26, 1998 || Socorro || LINEAR || FLO || align=right | 1.1 km || 
|-id=914 bgcolor=#d6d6d6
| 120914 ||  || — || September 26, 1998 || Socorro || LINEAR || KOR || align=right | 3.0 km || 
|-id=915 bgcolor=#fefefe
| 120915 ||  || — || September 26, 1998 || Socorro || LINEAR || — || align=right | 1.2 km || 
|-id=916 bgcolor=#fefefe
| 120916 ||  || — || September 26, 1998 || Socorro || LINEAR || FLO || align=right | 5.1 km || 
|-id=917 bgcolor=#d6d6d6
| 120917 ||  || — || September 26, 1998 || Socorro || LINEAR || — || align=right | 4.1 km || 
|-id=918 bgcolor=#fefefe
| 120918 ||  || — || September 26, 1998 || Socorro || LINEAR || — || align=right | 1.2 km || 
|-id=919 bgcolor=#fefefe
| 120919 ||  || — || September 26, 1998 || Socorro || LINEAR || — || align=right | 1.4 km || 
|-id=920 bgcolor=#fefefe
| 120920 ||  || — || September 26, 1998 || Socorro || LINEAR || — || align=right | 1.1 km || 
|-id=921 bgcolor=#fefefe
| 120921 ||  || — || September 26, 1998 || Socorro || LINEAR || — || align=right | 1.3 km || 
|-id=922 bgcolor=#fefefe
| 120922 ||  || — || September 26, 1998 || Socorro || LINEAR || — || align=right | 1.1 km || 
|-id=923 bgcolor=#d6d6d6
| 120923 ||  || — || September 26, 1998 || Socorro || LINEAR || EOS || align=right | 3.0 km || 
|-id=924 bgcolor=#fefefe
| 120924 ||  || — || September 26, 1998 || Socorro || LINEAR || — || align=right | 1.7 km || 
|-id=925 bgcolor=#d6d6d6
| 120925 ||  || — || September 26, 1998 || Socorro || LINEAR || — || align=right | 6.1 km || 
|-id=926 bgcolor=#fefefe
| 120926 ||  || — || September 26, 1998 || Socorro || LINEAR || — || align=right | 1.5 km || 
|-id=927 bgcolor=#d6d6d6
| 120927 ||  || — || September 26, 1998 || Socorro || LINEAR || — || align=right | 6.2 km || 
|-id=928 bgcolor=#fefefe
| 120928 ||  || — || September 26, 1998 || Socorro || LINEAR || V || align=right | 1.4 km || 
|-id=929 bgcolor=#fefefe
| 120929 ||  || — || September 26, 1998 || Socorro || LINEAR || — || align=right | 1.4 km || 
|-id=930 bgcolor=#fefefe
| 120930 ||  || — || September 26, 1998 || Socorro || LINEAR || FLO || align=right | 1.3 km || 
|-id=931 bgcolor=#fefefe
| 120931 ||  || — || September 26, 1998 || Socorro || LINEAR || — || align=right | 1.3 km || 
|-id=932 bgcolor=#fefefe
| 120932 ||  || — || September 26, 1998 || Socorro || LINEAR || — || align=right | 1.5 km || 
|-id=933 bgcolor=#fefefe
| 120933 ||  || — || September 20, 1998 || La Silla || E. W. Elst || — || align=right | 3.0 km || 
|-id=934 bgcolor=#d6d6d6
| 120934 ||  || — || September 26, 1998 || Socorro || LINEAR || — || align=right | 5.9 km || 
|-id=935 bgcolor=#d6d6d6
| 120935 ||  || — || September 26, 1998 || Socorro || LINEAR || — || align=right | 5.4 km || 
|-id=936 bgcolor=#d6d6d6
| 120936 ||  || — || September 26, 1998 || Socorro || LINEAR || — || align=right | 5.3 km || 
|-id=937 bgcolor=#fefefe
| 120937 ||  || — || September 26, 1998 || Socorro || LINEAR || FLO || align=right | 3.0 km || 
|-id=938 bgcolor=#d6d6d6
| 120938 ||  || — || September 26, 1998 || Socorro || LINEAR || — || align=right | 6.1 km || 
|-id=939 bgcolor=#d6d6d6
| 120939 ||  || — || September 26, 1998 || Socorro || LINEAR || KOR || align=right | 2.8 km || 
|-id=940 bgcolor=#d6d6d6
| 120940 ||  || — || October 13, 1998 || Kitt Peak || Spacewatch || — || align=right | 4.3 km || 
|-id=941 bgcolor=#fefefe
| 120941 ||  || — || October 14, 1998 || Caussols || ODAS || — || align=right | 1.2 km || 
|-id=942 bgcolor=#FA8072
| 120942 Rendafuzhong ||  ||  || October 1, 1998 || Xinglong || SCAP || — || align=right data-sort-value="0.98" | 980 m || 
|-id=943 bgcolor=#d6d6d6
| 120943 ||  || — || October 13, 1998 || Kitt Peak || Spacewatch || — || align=right | 5.3 km || 
|-id=944 bgcolor=#d6d6d6
| 120944 ||  || — || October 14, 1998 || Kitt Peak || Spacewatch || — || align=right | 6.0 km || 
|-id=945 bgcolor=#d6d6d6
| 120945 ||  || — || October 14, 1998 || Kitt Peak || Spacewatch || — || align=right | 5.7 km || 
|-id=946 bgcolor=#fefefe
| 120946 ||  || — || October 15, 1998 || Kitt Peak || Spacewatch || — || align=right | 1.2 km || 
|-id=947 bgcolor=#fefefe
| 120947 ||  || — || October 15, 1998 || Kitt Peak || Spacewatch || — || align=right | 2.6 km || 
|-id=948 bgcolor=#d6d6d6
| 120948 ||  || — || October 14, 1998 || Anderson Mesa || LONEOS || — || align=right | 5.3 km || 
|-id=949 bgcolor=#fefefe
| 120949 ||  || — || October 20, 1998 || Caussols || ODAS || NYS || align=right | 1.2 km || 
|-id=950 bgcolor=#fefefe
| 120950 ||  || — || October 20, 1998 || Farra d'Isonzo || Farra d'Isonzo || FLO || align=right | 1.2 km || 
|-id=951 bgcolor=#fefefe
| 120951 ||  || — || October 17, 1998 || Xinglong || SCAP || NYS || align=right | 1.0 km || 
|-id=952 bgcolor=#fefefe
| 120952 ||  || — || October 23, 1998 || Kitt Peak || Spacewatch || — || align=right | 1.5 km || 
|-id=953 bgcolor=#d6d6d6
| 120953 ||  || — || October 28, 1998 || Socorro || LINEAR || HYG || align=right | 5.3 km || 
|-id=954 bgcolor=#fefefe
| 120954 ||  || — || October 18, 1998 || La Silla || E. W. Elst || FLO || align=right | 1.8 km || 
|-id=955 bgcolor=#fefefe
| 120955 ||  || — || October 22, 1998 || Xinglong || SCAP || — || align=right | 1.9 km || 
|-id=956 bgcolor=#fefefe
| 120956 ||  || — || October 28, 1998 || Socorro || LINEAR || — || align=right | 1.4 km || 
|-id=957 bgcolor=#d6d6d6
| 120957 ||  || — || October 28, 1998 || Socorro || LINEAR || — || align=right | 4.6 km || 
|-id=958 bgcolor=#d6d6d6
| 120958 ||  || — || October 28, 1998 || Socorro || LINEAR || — || align=right | 8.8 km || 
|-id=959 bgcolor=#fefefe
| 120959 ||  || — || October 17, 1998 || Anderson Mesa || LONEOS || FLO || align=right data-sort-value="0.89" | 890 m || 
|-id=960 bgcolor=#fefefe
| 120960 ||  || — || November 10, 1998 || Caussols || ODAS || MAS || align=right | 1.3 km || 
|-id=961 bgcolor=#d6d6d6
| 120961 ||  || — || November 11, 1998 || Caussols || ODAS || EOS || align=right | 3.9 km || 
|-id=962 bgcolor=#d6d6d6
| 120962 ||  || — || November 10, 1998 || Socorro || LINEAR || 3:2 || align=right | 9.5 km || 
|-id=963 bgcolor=#d6d6d6
| 120963 ||  || — || November 10, 1998 || Socorro || LINEAR || — || align=right | 4.7 km || 
|-id=964 bgcolor=#fefefe
| 120964 ||  || — || November 10, 1998 || Socorro || LINEAR || NYS || align=right | 1.2 km || 
|-id=965 bgcolor=#fefefe
| 120965 ||  || — || November 10, 1998 || Socorro || LINEAR || — || align=right | 1.3 km || 
|-id=966 bgcolor=#FA8072
| 120966 ||  || — || November 10, 1998 || Socorro || LINEAR || — || align=right | 1.7 km || 
|-id=967 bgcolor=#fefefe
| 120967 ||  || — || November 10, 1998 || Socorro || LINEAR || — || align=right | 1.3 km || 
|-id=968 bgcolor=#fefefe
| 120968 ||  || — || November 10, 1998 || Reedy Creek || J. Broughton || — || align=right | 1.5 km || 
|-id=969 bgcolor=#fefefe
| 120969 ||  || — || November 10, 1998 || Socorro || LINEAR || FLO || align=right | 1.4 km || 
|-id=970 bgcolor=#fefefe
| 120970 ||  || — || November 15, 1998 || Kitt Peak || Spacewatch || NYS || align=right | 1.1 km || 
|-id=971 bgcolor=#d6d6d6
| 120971 ||  || — || November 11, 1998 || Socorro || LINEAR || EOS || align=right | 5.0 km || 
|-id=972 bgcolor=#fefefe
| 120972 ||  || — || November 20, 1998 || Gekko || T. Kagawa || — || align=right | 1.6 km || 
|-id=973 bgcolor=#fefefe
| 120973 ||  || — || November 19, 1998 || Catalina || CSS || — || align=right | 2.3 km || 
|-id=974 bgcolor=#fefefe
| 120974 ||  || — || November 18, 1998 || Chichibu || N. Satō || — || align=right | 1.8 km || 
|-id=975 bgcolor=#fefefe
| 120975 ||  || — || November 21, 1998 || Socorro || LINEAR || — || align=right | 1.3 km || 
|-id=976 bgcolor=#d6d6d6
| 120976 ||  || — || November 16, 1998 || Kitt Peak || Spacewatch || — || align=right | 4.5 km || 
|-id=977 bgcolor=#fefefe
| 120977 ||  || — || November 19, 1998 || Kitt Peak || Spacewatch || — || align=right | 1.6 km || 
|-id=978 bgcolor=#fefefe
| 120978 ||  || — || November 19, 1998 || Kitt Peak || Spacewatch || V || align=right data-sort-value="0.85" | 850 m || 
|-id=979 bgcolor=#fefefe
| 120979 || 1998 XU || — || December 7, 1998 || Caussols || ODAS || NYS || align=right data-sort-value="0.95" | 950 m || 
|-id=980 bgcolor=#fefefe
| 120980 ||  || — || December 8, 1998 || Kitt Peak || Spacewatch || — || align=right | 1.2 km || 
|-id=981 bgcolor=#fefefe
| 120981 ||  || — || December 8, 1998 || Kitt Peak || Spacewatch || NYS || align=right data-sort-value="0.92" | 920 m || 
|-id=982 bgcolor=#fefefe
| 120982 ||  || — || December 8, 1998 || Kitt Peak || Spacewatch || — || align=right | 1.2 km || 
|-id=983 bgcolor=#d6d6d6
| 120983 ||  || — || December 8, 1998 || Kitt Peak || Spacewatch || — || align=right | 5.5 km || 
|-id=984 bgcolor=#fefefe
| 120984 ||  || — || December 8, 1998 || Kitt Peak || Spacewatch || — || align=right | 1.6 km || 
|-id=985 bgcolor=#fefefe
| 120985 ||  || — || December 15, 1998 || Kleť || Kleť Obs. || FLO || align=right | 1.6 km || 
|-id=986 bgcolor=#fefefe
| 120986 ||  || — || December 15, 1998 || Socorro || LINEAR || — || align=right | 2.0 km || 
|-id=987 bgcolor=#d6d6d6
| 120987 ||  || — || December 8, 1998 || Kitt Peak || Spacewatch || — || align=right | 7.1 km || 
|-id=988 bgcolor=#d6d6d6
| 120988 ||  || — || December 8, 1998 || Kitt Peak || Spacewatch || — || align=right | 3.5 km || 
|-id=989 bgcolor=#fefefe
| 120989 ||  || — || December 10, 1998 || Kitt Peak || Spacewatch || — || align=right | 1.3 km || 
|-id=990 bgcolor=#fefefe
| 120990 ||  || — || December 10, 1998 || Kitt Peak || Spacewatch || FLO || align=right | 1.1 km || 
|-id=991 bgcolor=#fefefe
| 120991 ||  || — || December 10, 1998 || Kitt Peak || Spacewatch || — || align=right | 1.4 km || 
|-id=992 bgcolor=#d6d6d6
| 120992 ||  || — || December 11, 1998 || Kitt Peak || Spacewatch || — || align=right | 5.0 km || 
|-id=993 bgcolor=#fefefe
| 120993 ||  || — || December 13, 1998 || Kitt Peak || Spacewatch || — || align=right | 1.3 km || 
|-id=994 bgcolor=#fefefe
| 120994 ||  || — || December 14, 1998 || Socorro || LINEAR || — || align=right | 3.1 km || 
|-id=995 bgcolor=#fefefe
| 120995 ||  || — || December 11, 1998 || Socorro || LINEAR || PHO || align=right | 2.2 km || 
|-id=996 bgcolor=#fefefe
| 120996 ||  || — || December 15, 1998 || Socorro || LINEAR || — || align=right | 1.7 km || 
|-id=997 bgcolor=#fefefe
| 120997 ||  || — || December 11, 1998 || Mérida || O. A. Naranjo || NYS || align=right data-sort-value="0.94" | 940 m || 
|-id=998 bgcolor=#fefefe
| 120998 ||  || — || December 16, 1998 || Caussols || ODAS || FLO || align=right | 1.3 km || 
|-id=999 bgcolor=#fefefe
| 120999 ||  || — || December 17, 1998 || Caussols || ODAS || — || align=right | 2.3 km || 
|-id=000 bgcolor=#fefefe
| 121000 ||  || — || December 17, 1998 || Caussols || ODAS || — || align=right | 2.6 km || 
|}

References

External links 
 Discovery Circumstances: Numbered Minor Planets (120001)–(125000) (IAU Minor Planet Center)

0120